

58001–58100 

|-bgcolor=#E9E9E9
| 58001 ||  || — || October 4, 2002 || Socorro || LINEAR || HOF || align=right | 6.5 km || 
|-id=002 bgcolor=#E9E9E9
| 58002 ||  || — || October 4, 2002 || Socorro || LINEAR || — || align=right | 3.6 km || 
|-id=003 bgcolor=#E9E9E9
| 58003 ||  || — || October 14, 2002 || Socorro || LINEAR || — || align=right | 4.0 km || 
|-id=004 bgcolor=#fefefe
| 58004 ||  || — || October 4, 2002 || Socorro || LINEAR || FLO || align=right | 1.4 km || 
|-id=005 bgcolor=#fefefe
| 58005 ||  || — || October 4, 2002 || Socorro || LINEAR || — || align=right | 2.2 km || 
|-id=006 bgcolor=#fefefe
| 58006 ||  || — || October 6, 2002 || Socorro || LINEAR || — || align=right | 2.0 km || 
|-id=007 bgcolor=#d6d6d6
| 58007 ||  || — || October 6, 2002 || Socorro || LINEAR || INA || align=right | 12 km || 
|-id=008 bgcolor=#C2FFFF
| 58008 ||  || — || October 6, 2002 || Haleakala || NEAT || L5 || align=right | 25 km || 
|-id=009 bgcolor=#fefefe
| 58009 ||  || — || October 10, 2002 || Palomar || NEAT || — || align=right | 1.5 km || 
|-id=010 bgcolor=#fefefe
| 58010 ||  || — || October 10, 2002 || Socorro || LINEAR || — || align=right | 1.8 km || 
|-id=011 bgcolor=#d6d6d6
| 58011 ||  || — || October 10, 2002 || Socorro || LINEAR || VER || align=right | 8.6 km || 
|-id=012 bgcolor=#d6d6d6
| 58012 ||  || — || October 10, 2002 || Socorro || LINEAR || — || align=right | 7.1 km || 
|-id=013 bgcolor=#fefefe
| 58013 ||  || — || October 10, 2002 || Socorro || LINEAR || — || align=right | 5.0 km || 
|-id=014 bgcolor=#E9E9E9
| 58014 ||  || — || October 31, 2002 || Socorro || LINEAR || — || align=right | 3.2 km || 
|-id=015 bgcolor=#E9E9E9
| 58015 ||  || — || October 31, 2002 || Socorro || LINEAR || — || align=right | 3.4 km || 
|-id=016 bgcolor=#E9E9E9
| 58016 ||  || — || October 31, 2002 || Socorro || LINEAR || — || align=right | 5.5 km || 
|-id=017 bgcolor=#E9E9E9
| 58017 ||  || — || October 31, 2002 || Kitt Peak || Spacewatch || — || align=right | 2.7 km || 
|-id=018 bgcolor=#d6d6d6
| 58018 ||  || — || October 31, 2002 || Palomar || NEAT || EOS || align=right | 4.8 km || 
|-id=019 bgcolor=#E9E9E9
| 58019 ||  || — || October 31, 2002 || Anderson Mesa || LONEOS || AGN || align=right | 2.6 km || 
|-id=020 bgcolor=#d6d6d6
| 58020 ||  || — || November 5, 2002 || Socorro || LINEAR || — || align=right | 6.1 km || 
|-id=021 bgcolor=#d6d6d6
| 58021 ||  || — || November 5, 2002 || Socorro || LINEAR || KOR || align=right | 2.9 km || 
|-id=022 bgcolor=#fefefe
| 58022 ||  || — || November 5, 2002 || Socorro || LINEAR || — || align=right | 3.1 km || 
|-id=023 bgcolor=#FA8072
| 58023 ||  || — || November 6, 2002 || Haleakala || NEAT || — || align=right | 2.7 km || 
|-id=024 bgcolor=#d6d6d6
| 58024 ||  || — || November 5, 2002 || Socorro || LINEAR || EOS || align=right | 5.5 km || 
|-id=025 bgcolor=#fefefe
| 58025 ||  || — || November 5, 2002 || Anderson Mesa || LONEOS || — || align=right | 1.7 km || 
|-id=026 bgcolor=#fefefe
| 58026 ||  || — || November 6, 2002 || Socorro || LINEAR || — || align=right | 2.0 km || 
|-id=027 bgcolor=#E9E9E9
| 58027 ||  || — || November 6, 2002 || Haleakala || NEAT || — || align=right | 2.9 km || 
|-id=028 bgcolor=#E9E9E9
| 58028 ||  || — || November 6, 2002 || Socorro || LINEAR || NEM || align=right | 5.0 km || 
|-id=029 bgcolor=#fefefe
| 58029 ||  || — || November 6, 2002 || Anderson Mesa || LONEOS || — || align=right | 2.8 km || 
|-id=030 bgcolor=#E9E9E9
| 58030 ||  || — || November 8, 2002 || Socorro || LINEAR || — || align=right | 3.1 km || 
|-id=031 bgcolor=#fefefe
| 58031 ||  || — || November 7, 2002 || Socorro || LINEAR || FLO || align=right | 1.3 km || 
|-id=032 bgcolor=#d6d6d6
| 58032 ||  || — || November 8, 2002 || Socorro || LINEAR || — || align=right | 6.2 km || 
|-id=033 bgcolor=#E9E9E9
| 58033 ||  || — || November 8, 2002 || Socorro || LINEAR || — || align=right | 3.8 km || 
|-id=034 bgcolor=#E9E9E9
| 58034 ||  || — || November 11, 2002 || Socorro || LINEAR || — || align=right | 2.1 km || 
|-id=035 bgcolor=#fefefe
| 58035 ||  || — || November 12, 2002 || Socorro || LINEAR || FLO || align=right | 1.9 km || 
|-id=036 bgcolor=#d6d6d6
| 58036 ||  || — || November 12, 2002 || Socorro || LINEAR || — || align=right | 7.7 km || 
|-id=037 bgcolor=#d6d6d6
| 58037 ||  || — || November 12, 2002 || Socorro || LINEAR || — || align=right | 4.8 km || 
|-id=038 bgcolor=#fefefe
| 58038 ||  || — || November 12, 2002 || Socorro || LINEAR || NYS || align=right | 1.5 km || 
|-id=039 bgcolor=#fefefe
| 58039 ||  || — || November 13, 2002 || Palomar || NEAT || MAS || align=right | 2.1 km || 
|-id=040 bgcolor=#E9E9E9
| 58040 ||  || — || November 13, 2002 || Palomar || NEAT || RAF || align=right | 3.2 km || 
|-id=041 bgcolor=#d6d6d6
| 58041 ||  || — || November 14, 2002 || Socorro || LINEAR || — || align=right | 11 km || 
|-id=042 bgcolor=#E9E9E9
| 58042 ||  || — || November 14, 2002 || Socorro || LINEAR || EUN || align=right | 6.8 km || 
|-id=043 bgcolor=#d6d6d6
| 58043 ||  || — || November 14, 2002 || Socorro || LINEAR || — || align=right | 4.7 km || 
|-id=044 bgcolor=#d6d6d6
| 58044 || 2002 WF || — || November 17, 2002 || Ametlla de Mar || J. Nomen || — || align=right | 14 km || 
|-id=045 bgcolor=#E9E9E9
| 58045 ||  || — || November 28, 2002 || Haleakala || NEAT || — || align=right | 3.0 km || 
|-id=046 bgcolor=#FA8072
| 58046 ||  || — || December 1, 2002 || Haleakala || NEAT || PHO || align=right | 2.8 km || 
|-id=047 bgcolor=#E9E9E9
| 58047 ||  || — || December 2, 2002 || Socorro || LINEAR || — || align=right | 3.9 km || 
|-id=048 bgcolor=#fefefe
| 58048 ||  || — || December 11, 2002 || Socorro || LINEAR || — || align=right | 2.9 km || 
|-id=049 bgcolor=#fefefe
| 58049 ||  || — || December 11, 2002 || Socorro || LINEAR || V || align=right | 1.5 km || 
|-id=050 bgcolor=#FA8072
| 58050 || 2002 YA || — || December 18, 2002 || Haleakala || NEAT || — || align=right | 3.0 km || 
|-id=051 bgcolor=#fefefe
| 58051 ||  || — || December 28, 2002 || Ametlla de Mar || Ametlla de Mar Obs. || — || align=right | 4.5 km || 
|-id=052 bgcolor=#d6d6d6
| 58052 ||  || — || January 1, 2003 || Socorro || LINEAR || EOS || align=right | 4.3 km || 
|-id=053 bgcolor=#fefefe
| 58053 ||  || — || January 1, 2003 || Socorro || LINEAR || FLO || align=right | 2.5 km || 
|-id=054 bgcolor=#E9E9E9
| 58054 ||  || — || January 1, 2003 || Socorro || LINEAR || — || align=right | 2.2 km || 
|-id=055 bgcolor=#fefefe
| 58055 ||  || — || January 1, 2003 || Socorro || LINEAR || — || align=right | 2.2 km || 
|-id=056 bgcolor=#fefefe
| 58056 ||  || — || January 7, 2003 || Socorro || LINEAR || — || align=right | 1.5 km || 
|-id=057 bgcolor=#E9E9E9
| 58057 ||  || — || January 5, 2003 || Socorro || LINEAR || — || align=right | 5.2 km || 
|-id=058 bgcolor=#E9E9E9
| 58058 || 2118 P-L || — || September 24, 1960 || Palomar || PLS || — || align=right | 2.4 km || 
|-id=059 bgcolor=#E9E9E9
| 58059 || 2690 P-L || — || September 24, 1960 || Palomar || PLS || — || align=right | 2.3 km || 
|-id=060 bgcolor=#d6d6d6
| 58060 || 2751 P-L || — || September 24, 1960 || Palomar || PLS || THM || align=right | 6.6 km || 
|-id=061 bgcolor=#E9E9E9
| 58061 || 2769 P-L || — || September 24, 1960 || Palomar || PLS || — || align=right | 2.7 km || 
|-id=062 bgcolor=#fefefe
| 58062 || 4034 P-L || — || September 24, 1960 || Palomar || PLS || — || align=right | 1.5 km || 
|-id=063 bgcolor=#d6d6d6
| 58063 || 6024 P-L || — || September 24, 1960 || Palomar || PLS || HYG || align=right | 6.1 km || 
|-id=064 bgcolor=#E9E9E9
| 58064 || 6220 P-L || — || September 24, 1960 || Palomar || PLS || — || align=right | 2.2 km || 
|-id=065 bgcolor=#d6d6d6
| 58065 || 6814 P-L || — || September 24, 1960 || Palomar || PLS || — || align=right | 5.9 km || 
|-id=066 bgcolor=#E9E9E9
| 58066 || 7579 P-L || — || October 17, 1960 || Palomar || PLS || — || align=right | 4.7 km || 
|-id=067 bgcolor=#fefefe
| 58067 || 2269 T-1 || — || March 25, 1971 || Palomar || PLS || FLO || align=right | 1.8 km || 
|-id=068 bgcolor=#E9E9E9
| 58068 || 3143 T-1 || — || March 26, 1971 || Palomar || PLS || — || align=right | 7.8 km || 
|-id=069 bgcolor=#E9E9E9
| 58069 || 4310 T-1 || — || March 26, 1971 || Palomar || PLS || — || align=right | 8.9 km || 
|-id=070 bgcolor=#FA8072
| 58070 || 1034 T-2 || — || September 29, 1973 || Palomar || PLS || — || align=right | 1.5 km || 
|-id=071 bgcolor=#E9E9E9
| 58071 || 1308 T-2 || — || September 29, 1973 || Palomar || PLS || — || align=right | 3.3 km || 
|-id=072 bgcolor=#d6d6d6
| 58072 || 1476 T-2 || — || September 30, 1973 || Palomar || PLS || — || align=right | 5.7 km || 
|-id=073 bgcolor=#E9E9E9
| 58073 || 1514 T-2 || — || September 29, 1973 || Palomar || PLS || — || align=right | 2.0 km || 
|-id=074 bgcolor=#E9E9E9
| 58074 || 1612 T-2 || — || September 24, 1973 || Palomar || PLS || — || align=right | 2.0 km || 
|-id=075 bgcolor=#d6d6d6
| 58075 || 2205 T-2 || — || September 29, 1973 || Palomar || PLS || THM || align=right | 6.7 km || 
|-id=076 bgcolor=#fefefe
| 58076 || 2208 T-2 || — || September 29, 1973 || Palomar || PLS || — || align=right | 1.8 km || 
|-id=077 bgcolor=#E9E9E9
| 58077 || 2209 T-2 || — || September 29, 1973 || Palomar || PLS || AGN || align=right | 2.5 km || 
|-id=078 bgcolor=#E9E9E9
| 58078 || 3003 T-2 || — || September 30, 1973 || Palomar || PLS || — || align=right | 2.8 km || 
|-id=079 bgcolor=#E9E9E9
| 58079 || 3244 T-2 || — || September 30, 1973 || Palomar || PLS || — || align=right | 3.3 km || 
|-id=080 bgcolor=#E9E9E9
| 58080 || 4228 T-2 || — || September 29, 1973 || Palomar || PLS || PAD || align=right | 5.4 km || 
|-id=081 bgcolor=#fefefe
| 58081 || 4817 T-2 || — || September 25, 1973 || Palomar || PLS || — || align=right | 1.6 km || 
|-id=082 bgcolor=#E9E9E9
| 58082 || 5072 T-2 || — || September 25, 1973 || Palomar || PLS || — || align=right | 6.9 km || 
|-id=083 bgcolor=#fefefe
| 58083 || 5459 T-2 || — || September 30, 1973 || Palomar || PLS || — || align=right | 2.4 km || 
|-id=084 bgcolor=#C2FFFF
| 58084 Hiketaon || 1197 T-3 ||  || October 17, 1977 || Palomar || PLS || L5 || align=right | 16 km || 
|-id=085 bgcolor=#E9E9E9
| 58085 || 1199 T-3 || — || October 17, 1977 || Palomar || PLS || GEFslow || align=right | 7.8 km || 
|-id=086 bgcolor=#E9E9E9
| 58086 || 2017 T-3 || — || October 16, 1977 || Palomar || PLS || — || align=right | 2.6 km || 
|-id=087 bgcolor=#E9E9E9
| 58087 || 2156 T-3 || — || October 16, 1977 || Palomar || PLS || — || align=right | 2.9 km || 
|-id=088 bgcolor=#fefefe
| 58088 || 2256 T-3 || — || October 16, 1977 || Palomar || PLS || V || align=right | 1.6 km || 
|-id=089 bgcolor=#fefefe
| 58089 || 2352 T-3 || — || October 16, 1977 || Palomar || PLS || FLO || align=right | 1.4 km || 
|-id=090 bgcolor=#E9E9E9
| 58090 || 3452 T-3 || — || October 16, 1977 || Palomar || PLS || — || align=right | 2.2 km || 
|-id=091 bgcolor=#d6d6d6
| 58091 || 3768 T-3 || — || October 16, 1977 || Palomar || PLS || — || align=right | 6.7 km || 
|-id=092 bgcolor=#d6d6d6
| 58092 || 4053 T-3 || — || October 16, 1977 || Palomar || PLS || — || align=right | 8.4 km || 
|-id=093 bgcolor=#fefefe
| 58093 || 1934 JP || — || May 9, 1934 || Mount Hamilton || H. M. Jeffers || — || align=right | 1.9 km || 
|-id=094 bgcolor=#fefefe
| 58094 || 1972 AP || — || January 14, 1972 || Hamburg-Bergedorf || L. Kohoutek || — || align=right | 2.2 km || 
|-id=095 bgcolor=#d6d6d6
| 58095 Oranienstein || 1973 SN ||  || September 19, 1973 || Palomar || PLS || 3:2 || align=right | 12 km || 
|-id=096 bgcolor=#C2FFFF
| 58096 Oineus ||  ||  || September 29, 1973 || Palomar || PLS || L4 || align=right | 13 km || 
|-id=097 bgcolor=#E9E9E9
| 58097 Alimov ||  ||  || October 26, 1976 || Nauchnij || T. M. Smirnova || — || align=right | 3.9 km || 
|-id=098 bgcolor=#fefefe
| 58098 Quirrenbach || 1977 TC ||  || October 9, 1977 || La Silla || L. D. Schmadel || H || align=right | 2.0 km || 
|-id=099 bgcolor=#fefefe
| 58099 ||  || — || September 2, 1978 || La Silla || C.-I. Lagerkvist || FLO || align=right | 1.4 km || 
|-id=100 bgcolor=#E9E9E9
| 58100 ||  || — || November 7, 1978 || Palomar || E. F. Helin, S. J. Bus || — || align=right | 6.3 km || 
|}

58101–58200 

|-bgcolor=#fefefe
| 58101 ||  || — || June 25, 1979 || Siding Spring || E. F. Helin, S. J. Bus || — || align=right | 2.8 km || 
|-id=102 bgcolor=#E9E9E9
| 58102 ||  || — || June 25, 1979 || Siding Spring || E. F. Helin, S. J. Bus || EUN || align=right | 3.3 km || 
|-id=103 bgcolor=#d6d6d6
| 58103 ||  || — || June 25, 1979 || Siding Spring || E. F. Helin, S. J. Bus || — || align=right | 6.0 km || 
|-id=104 bgcolor=#fefefe
| 58104 ||  || — || June 25, 1979 || Siding Spring || E. F. Helin, S. J. Bus || NYS || align=right | 2.4 km || 
|-id=105 bgcolor=#d6d6d6
| 58105 ||  || — || June 25, 1979 || Siding Spring || E. F. Helin, S. J. Bus || — || align=right | 5.5 km || 
|-id=106 bgcolor=#d6d6d6
| 58106 ||  || — || June 25, 1979 || Siding Spring || E. F. Helin, S. J. Bus || EOS || align=right | 4.4 km || 
|-id=107 bgcolor=#fefefe
| 58107 ||  || — || July 24, 1979 || Siding Spring || S. J. Bus || H || align=right | 1.4 km || 
|-id=108 bgcolor=#E9E9E9
| 58108 ||  || — || August 22, 1979 || La Silla || C.-I. Lagerkvist || — || align=right | 3.0 km || 
|-id=109 bgcolor=#E9E9E9
| 58109 || 1980 PQ || — || August 6, 1980 || Kleť || Z. Vávrová || MIT || align=right | 8.2 km || 
|-id=110 bgcolor=#fefefe
| 58110 ||  || — || October 31, 1980 || Palomar || S. J. Bus || — || align=right | 2.2 km || 
|-id=111 bgcolor=#d6d6d6
| 58111 ||  || — || March 2, 1981 || Siding Spring || S. J. Bus || — || align=right | 5.7 km || 
|-id=112 bgcolor=#fefefe
| 58112 ||  || — || March 2, 1981 || Siding Spring || S. J. Bus || — || align=right | 1.6 km || 
|-id=113 bgcolor=#fefefe
| 58113 ||  || — || March 2, 1981 || Siding Spring || S. J. Bus || FLO || align=right data-sort-value="0.89" | 890 m || 
|-id=114 bgcolor=#d6d6d6
| 58114 ||  || — || March 6, 1981 || Siding Spring || S. J. Bus || — || align=right | 4.8 km || 
|-id=115 bgcolor=#d6d6d6
| 58115 ||  || — || March 6, 1981 || Siding Spring || S. J. Bus || EOS || align=right | 4.3 km || 
|-id=116 bgcolor=#E9E9E9
| 58116 ||  || — || March 7, 1981 || Siding Spring || S. J. Bus || MAR || align=right | 2.1 km || 
|-id=117 bgcolor=#fefefe
| 58117 ||  || — || March 1, 1981 || Siding Spring || S. J. Bus || — || align=right | 1.6 km || 
|-id=118 bgcolor=#E9E9E9
| 58118 ||  || — || March 1, 1981 || Siding Spring || S. J. Bus || — || align=right | 2.9 km || 
|-id=119 bgcolor=#E9E9E9
| 58119 ||  || — || March 1, 1981 || Siding Spring || S. J. Bus || — || align=right | 2.1 km || 
|-id=120 bgcolor=#E9E9E9
| 58120 ||  || — || March 7, 1981 || Siding Spring || S. J. Bus || ADE || align=right | 5.3 km || 
|-id=121 bgcolor=#fefefe
| 58121 ||  || — || March 1, 1981 || Siding Spring || S. J. Bus || V || align=right | 1.7 km || 
|-id=122 bgcolor=#fefefe
| 58122 ||  || — || March 2, 1981 || Siding Spring || S. J. Bus || — || align=right | 1.7 km || 
|-id=123 bgcolor=#d6d6d6
| 58123 ||  || — || March 2, 1981 || Siding Spring || S. J. Bus || HYG || align=right | 6.3 km || 
|-id=124 bgcolor=#E9E9E9
| 58124 ||  || — || March 1, 1981 || Siding Spring || S. J. Bus || — || align=right | 5.4 km || 
|-id=125 bgcolor=#E9E9E9
| 58125 ||  || — || March 2, 1981 || Siding Spring || S. J. Bus || — || align=right | 2.8 km || 
|-id=126 bgcolor=#E9E9E9
| 58126 ||  || — || March 6, 1981 || Siding Spring || S. J. Bus || — || align=right | 2.9 km || 
|-id=127 bgcolor=#fefefe
| 58127 ||  || — || March 1, 1981 || Siding Spring || S. J. Bus || — || align=right | 1.3 km || 
|-id=128 bgcolor=#fefefe
| 58128 ||  || — || March 1, 1981 || Siding Spring || S. J. Bus || V || align=right | 1.5 km || 
|-id=129 bgcolor=#E9E9E9
| 58129 ||  || — || March 1, 1981 || Siding Spring || S. J. Bus || — || align=right | 5.0 km || 
|-id=130 bgcolor=#E9E9E9
| 58130 ||  || — || March 1, 1981 || Siding Spring || S. J. Bus || ADE || align=right | 4.7 km || 
|-id=131 bgcolor=#d6d6d6
| 58131 ||  || — || March 2, 1981 || Siding Spring || S. J. Bus || — || align=right | 3.9 km || 
|-id=132 bgcolor=#d6d6d6
| 58132 ||  || — || March 2, 1981 || Siding Spring || S. J. Bus || — || align=right | 6.0 km || 
|-id=133 bgcolor=#fefefe
| 58133 ||  || — || March 2, 1981 || Siding Spring || S. J. Bus || NYS || align=right | 3.9 km || 
|-id=134 bgcolor=#fefefe
| 58134 ||  || — || March 2, 1981 || Siding Spring || S. J. Bus || — || align=right | 3.2 km || 
|-id=135 bgcolor=#d6d6d6
| 58135 ||  || — || March 2, 1981 || Siding Spring || S. J. Bus || HYG || align=right | 5.3 km || 
|-id=136 bgcolor=#fefefe
| 58136 ||  || — || March 2, 1981 || Siding Spring || S. J. Bus || — || align=right | 2.1 km || 
|-id=137 bgcolor=#d6d6d6
| 58137 ||  || — || March 7, 1981 || Siding Spring || S. J. Bus || EOS || align=right | 5.3 km || 
|-id=138 bgcolor=#d6d6d6
| 58138 ||  || — || March 1, 1981 || Siding Spring || S. J. Bus || THB || align=right | 5.0 km || 
|-id=139 bgcolor=#E9E9E9
| 58139 ||  || — || March 2, 1981 || Siding Spring || S. J. Bus || — || align=right | 4.6 km || 
|-id=140 bgcolor=#fefefe
| 58140 || 1981 SN || — || September 22, 1981 || Kleť || A. Mrkos || — || align=right | 4.3 km || 
|-id=141 bgcolor=#FA8072
| 58141 ||  || — || October 24, 1981 || Palomar || S. J. Bus || — || align=right | 2.2 km || 
|-id=142 bgcolor=#fefefe
| 58142 ||  || — || September 4, 1983 || La Silla || H. Debehogne || — || align=right | 5.0 km || 
|-id=143 bgcolor=#E9E9E9
| 58143 ||  || — || November 1, 1983 || Cavriana || Cavriana Obs. || — || align=right | 6.6 km || 
|-id=144 bgcolor=#E9E9E9
| 58144 || 1983 WU || — || November 29, 1983 || Anderson Mesa || E. Bowell || — || align=right | 4.2 km || 
|-id=145 bgcolor=#fefefe
| 58145 Gus ||  ||  || August 1, 1986 || Palomar || M. Rudnyk || — || align=right | 4.1 km || 
|-id=146 bgcolor=#fefefe
| 58146 || 1986 RU || — || September 6, 1986 || Palomar || E. F. Helin || — || align=right | 5.1 km || 
|-id=147 bgcolor=#E9E9E9
| 58147 || 1986 WK || — || November 29, 1986 || Ojima || T. Niijima, T. Urata || — || align=right | 4.6 km || 
|-id=148 bgcolor=#E9E9E9
| 58148 ||  || — || September 29, 1987 || Anderson Mesa || E. Bowell || EUN || align=right | 5.4 km || 
|-id=149 bgcolor=#FA8072
| 58149 ||  || — || September 26, 1987 || La Silla || H. Debehogne || — || align=right | 4.0 km || 
|-id=150 bgcolor=#fefefe
| 58150 ||  || — || February 13, 1988 || La Silla || E. W. Elst || — || align=right | 2.2 km || 
|-id=151 bgcolor=#E9E9E9
| 58151 ||  || — || February 15, 1988 || La Silla || E. W. Elst || GEF || align=right | 3.5 km || 
|-id=152 bgcolor=#E9E9E9
| 58152 Natsöderblom ||  ||  || August 12, 1988 || Tautenburg Observatory || F. Börngen || — || align=right | 2.3 km || 
|-id=153 bgcolor=#C2FFFF
| 58153 ||  || — || September 14, 1988 || Cerro Tololo || S. J. Bus || L5 || align=right | 16 km || 
|-id=154 bgcolor=#fefefe
| 58154 ||  || — || September 14, 1988 || Cerro Tololo || S. J. Bus || — || align=right | 1.5 km || 
|-id=155 bgcolor=#fefefe
| 58155 || 1988 VD || — || November 3, 1988 || Brorfelde || P. Jensen || H || align=right | 2.3 km || 
|-id=156 bgcolor=#fefefe
| 58156 || 1989 GL || — || April 6, 1989 || Palomar || E. F. Helin || — || align=right | 3.9 km || 
|-id=157 bgcolor=#fefefe
| 58157 ||  || — || April 3, 1989 || La Silla || E. W. Elst || FLO || align=right | 2.1 km || 
|-id=158 bgcolor=#fefefe
| 58158 || 1989 RA || — || September 1, 1989 || Lake Tekapo || A. C. Gilmore, P. M. Kilmartin || — || align=right | 2.2 km || 
|-id=159 bgcolor=#fefefe
| 58159 ||  || — || September 26, 1989 || La Silla || E. W. Elst || NYS || align=right | 2.5 km || 
|-id=160 bgcolor=#E9E9E9
| 58160 ||  || — || September 26, 1989 || La Silla || E. W. Elst || EUN || align=right | 3.8 km || 
|-id=161 bgcolor=#fefefe
| 58161 ||  || — || September 26, 1989 || La Silla || E. W. Elst || NYS || align=right | 2.1 km || 
|-id=162 bgcolor=#E9E9E9
| 58162 ||  || — || October 7, 1989 || La Silla || E. W. Elst || — || align=right | 2.5 km || 
|-id=163 bgcolor=#fefefe
| 58163 Minnesang ||  ||  || October 23, 1989 || Tautenburg Observatory || F. Börngen || — || align=right | 2.2 km || 
|-id=164 bgcolor=#fefefe
| 58164 Reiwanohoshi ||  ||  || November 20, 1989 || Geisei || T. Seki || V || align=right | 2.5 km || 
|-id=165 bgcolor=#fefefe
| 58165 ||  || — || April 29, 1990 || Siding Spring || A. Żytkow, M. J. Irwin || FLO || align=right | 3.3 km || 
|-id=166 bgcolor=#d6d6d6
| 58166 ||  || — || July 29, 1990 || Palomar || H. E. Holt || — || align=right | 9.0 km || 
|-id=167 bgcolor=#fefefe
| 58167 ||  || — || August 28, 1990 || Palomar || H. E. Holt || V || align=right | 1.8 km || 
|-id=168 bgcolor=#fefefe
| 58168 ||  || — || August 16, 1990 || La Silla || E. W. Elst || FLO || align=right | 2.5 km || 
|-id=169 bgcolor=#fefefe
| 58169 ||  || — || September 18, 1990 || Palomar || H. E. Holt || — || align=right | 2.5 km || 
|-id=170 bgcolor=#fefefe
| 58170 ||  || — || September 22, 1990 || La Silla || E. W. Elst || FLO || align=right | 1.8 km || 
|-id=171 bgcolor=#fefefe
| 58171 ||  || — || September 22, 1990 || La Silla || E. W. Elst || MAS || align=right | 1.6 km || 
|-id=172 bgcolor=#d6d6d6
| 58172 ||  || — || September 22, 1990 || La Silla || E. W. Elst || — || align=right | 6.0 km || 
|-id=173 bgcolor=#fefefe
| 58173 ||  || — || September 16, 1990 || Palomar || H. E. Holt || — || align=right | 2.8 km || 
|-id=174 bgcolor=#fefefe
| 58174 ||  || — || September 20, 1990 || Palomar || H. E. Holt || — || align=right | 2.2 km || 
|-id=175 bgcolor=#FA8072
| 58175 ||  || — || September 17, 1990 || Palomar || H. E. Holt || — || align=right | 2.0 km || 
|-id=176 bgcolor=#fefefe
| 58176 ||  || — || September 17, 1990 || Palomar || H. E. Holt || — || align=right | 2.9 km || 
|-id=177 bgcolor=#fefefe
| 58177 ||  || — || October 9, 1990 || Siding Spring || R. H. McNaught || — || align=right | 2.6 km || 
|-id=178 bgcolor=#fefefe
| 58178 ||  || — || October 20, 1990 || Siding Spring || R. H. McNaught || — || align=right | 3.8 km || 
|-id=179 bgcolor=#fefefe
| 58179 ||  || — || October 16, 1990 || La Silla || E. W. Elst || ERI || align=right | 4.0 km || 
|-id=180 bgcolor=#fefefe
| 58180 ||  || — || November 21, 1990 || La Silla || E. W. Elst || — || align=right | 2.0 km || 
|-id=181 bgcolor=#E9E9E9
| 58181 ||  || — || February 7, 1991 || Kitami || K. Endate, K. Watanabe || — || align=right | 3.9 km || 
|-id=182 bgcolor=#E9E9E9
| 58182 ||  || — || August 2, 1991 || La Silla || E. W. Elst || — || align=right | 4.0 km || 
|-id=183 bgcolor=#E9E9E9
| 58183 ||  || — || August 15, 1991 || Palomar || E. F. Helin || JUN || align=right | 3.0 km || 
|-id=184 bgcolor=#fefefe
| 58184 Masayukiyamamoto ||  ||  || September 7, 1991 || Geisei || T. Seki || MAS || align=right | 2.2 km || 
|-id=185 bgcolor=#fefefe
| 58185 Rokkosan ||  ||  || September 7, 1991 || Geisei || T. Seki || — || align=right | 2.2 km || 
|-id=186 bgcolor=#fefefe
| 58186 Langkavel ||  ||  || September 13, 1991 || Tautenburg Observatory || L. D. Schmadel, F. Börngen || — || align=right | 1.7 km || 
|-id=187 bgcolor=#E9E9E9
| 58187 || 1991 TD || — || October 1, 1991 || Siding Spring || R. H. McNaught || EUN || align=right | 3.1 km || 
|-id=188 bgcolor=#d6d6d6
| 58188 ||  || — || October 1, 1991 || Kitt Peak || Spacewatch || 3:2 || align=right | 9.1 km || 
|-id=189 bgcolor=#fefefe
| 58189 ||  || — || November 4, 1991 || Kitt Peak || Spacewatch || MAS || align=right | 1.4 km || 
|-id=190 bgcolor=#fefefe
| 58190 ||  || — || November 8, 1991 || Kitt Peak || Spacewatch || FLO || align=right | 1.4 km || 
|-id=191 bgcolor=#fefefe
| 58191 Dolomiten ||  ||  || December 28, 1991 || Tautenburg Observatory || F. Börngen || V || align=right | 2.5 km || 
|-id=192 bgcolor=#fefefe
| 58192 || 1992 AQ || — || January 10, 1992 || Palomar || E. F. Helin || PHO || align=right | 2.1 km || 
|-id=193 bgcolor=#d6d6d6
| 58193 ||  || — || February 29, 1992 || La Silla || UESAC || THM || align=right | 6.5 km || 
|-id=194 bgcolor=#E9E9E9
| 58194 ||  || — || February 29, 1992 || La Silla || UESAC || — || align=right | 2.2 km || 
|-id=195 bgcolor=#fefefe
| 58195 ||  || — || February 29, 1992 || La Silla || UESAC || V || align=right | 1.9 km || 
|-id=196 bgcolor=#E9E9E9
| 58196 Ashleyess ||  ||  || March 10, 1992 || Siding Spring || D. I. Steel || — || align=right | 5.0 km || 
|-id=197 bgcolor=#fefefe
| 58197 ||  || — || March 6, 1992 || Kitt Peak || Spacewatch || — || align=right | 1.7 km || 
|-id=198 bgcolor=#fefefe
| 58198 ||  || — || March 7, 1992 || Kitt Peak || Spacewatch || — || align=right | 1.5 km || 
|-id=199 bgcolor=#fefefe
| 58199 ||  || — || March 1, 1992 || La Silla || UESAC || — || align=right | 2.0 km || 
|-id=200 bgcolor=#fefefe
| 58200 ||  || — || March 1, 1992 || La Silla || UESAC || — || align=right | 2.1 km || 
|}

58201–58300 

|-bgcolor=#d6d6d6
| 58201 ||  || — || March 1, 1992 || La Silla || UESAC || EMA || align=right | 7.8 km || 
|-id=202 bgcolor=#fefefe
| 58202 ||  || — || March 1, 1992 || La Silla || UESAC || FLO || align=right | 1.9 km || 
|-id=203 bgcolor=#fefefe
| 58203 ||  || — || March 2, 1992 || La Silla || UESAC || V || align=right | 2.0 km || 
|-id=204 bgcolor=#d6d6d6
| 58204 ||  || — || March 2, 1992 || La Silla || UESAC || — || align=right | 5.2 km || 
|-id=205 bgcolor=#fefefe
| 58205 ||  || — || March 1, 1992 || La Silla || UESAC || MAS || align=right | 1.8 km || 
|-id=206 bgcolor=#d6d6d6
| 58206 ||  || — || March 2, 1992 || La Silla || UESAC || — || align=right | 5.1 km || 
|-id=207 bgcolor=#fefefe
| 58207 ||  || — || March 2, 1992 || La Silla || UESAC || FLO || align=right | 1.5 km || 
|-id=208 bgcolor=#fefefe
| 58208 ||  || — || March 1, 1992 || La Silla || UESAC || — || align=right | 2.3 km || 
|-id=209 bgcolor=#d6d6d6
| 58209 ||  || — || March 1, 1992 || La Silla || UESAC || — || align=right | 5.2 km || 
|-id=210 bgcolor=#d6d6d6
| 58210 ||  || — || March 1, 1992 || La Silla || UESAC || — || align=right | 6.8 km || 
|-id=211 bgcolor=#fefefe
| 58211 ||  || — || April 23, 1992 || La Silla || E. W. Elst || — || align=right | 5.8 km || 
|-id=212 bgcolor=#E9E9E9
| 58212 ||  || — || July 30, 1992 || La Silla || E. W. Elst || — || align=right | 5.1 km || 
|-id=213 bgcolor=#fefefe
| 58213 || 1992 QP || — || August 29, 1992 || Palomar || E. F. Helin || — || align=right | 4.0 km || 
|-id=214 bgcolor=#d6d6d6
| 58214 Amorim ||  ||  || September 2, 1992 || La Silla || E. W. Elst || BRA || align=right | 5.0 km || 
|-id=215 bgcolor=#E9E9E9
| 58215 von Klitzing ||  ||  || September 21, 1992 || Tautenburg Observatory || F. Börngen, L. D. Schmadel || — || align=right | 4.7 km || 
|-id=216 bgcolor=#fefefe
| 58216 ||  || — || September 27, 1992 || Kitt Peak || Spacewatch || — || align=right | 2.3 km || 
|-id=217 bgcolor=#E9E9E9
| 58217 Peterhebel ||  ||  || September 24, 1992 || Tautenburg Observatory || L. D. Schmadel, F. Börngen || — || align=right | 2.3 km || 
|-id=218 bgcolor=#E9E9E9
| 58218 ||  || — || October 23, 1992 || Caussols || E. W. Elst || — || align=right | 5.1 km || 
|-id=219 bgcolor=#E9E9E9
| 58219 ||  || — || November 18, 1992 || Kushiro || S. Ueda, H. Kaneda || MAR || align=right | 5.1 km || 
|-id=220 bgcolor=#fefefe
| 58220 ||  || — || January 27, 1993 || Caussols || E. W. Elst || — || align=right | 2.6 km || 
|-id=221 bgcolor=#E9E9E9
| 58221 Boston ||  ||  || January 23, 1993 || La Silla || E. W. Elst || GEF || align=right | 3.7 km || 
|-id=222 bgcolor=#fefefe
| 58222 ||  || — || March 17, 1993 || La Silla || UESAC || FLO || align=right | 2.2 km || 
|-id=223 bgcolor=#d6d6d6
| 58223 ||  || — || March 17, 1993 || La Silla || UESAC || — || align=right | 7.8 km || 
|-id=224 bgcolor=#d6d6d6
| 58224 ||  || — || March 19, 1993 || La Silla || UESAC || VER || align=right | 7.0 km || 
|-id=225 bgcolor=#d6d6d6
| 58225 ||  || — || March 21, 1993 || La Silla || UESAC || — || align=right | 4.2 km || 
|-id=226 bgcolor=#d6d6d6
| 58226 ||  || — || March 21, 1993 || La Silla || UESAC || HYG || align=right | 7.9 km || 
|-id=227 bgcolor=#fefefe
| 58227 ||  || — || March 21, 1993 || La Silla || UESAC || — || align=right | 1.7 km || 
|-id=228 bgcolor=#fefefe
| 58228 ||  || — || March 21, 1993 || La Silla || UESAC || FLO || align=right | 1.6 km || 
|-id=229 bgcolor=#d6d6d6
| 58229 ||  || — || March 21, 1993 || La Silla || UESAC || — || align=right | 4.3 km || 
|-id=230 bgcolor=#fefefe
| 58230 ||  || — || March 19, 1993 || La Silla || UESAC || — || align=right | 1.6 km || 
|-id=231 bgcolor=#d6d6d6
| 58231 ||  || — || March 19, 1993 || La Silla || UESAC || THM || align=right | 7.6 km || 
|-id=232 bgcolor=#fefefe
| 58232 ||  || — || March 19, 1993 || La Silla || UESAC || FLO || align=right | 1.6 km || 
|-id=233 bgcolor=#fefefe
| 58233 ||  || — || March 19, 1993 || La Silla || UESAC || — || align=right | 1.3 km || 
|-id=234 bgcolor=#E9E9E9
| 58234 ||  || — || March 19, 1993 || La Silla || UESAC || HEN || align=right | 2.5 km || 
|-id=235 bgcolor=#fefefe
| 58235 ||  || — || March 17, 1993 || La Silla || UESAC || FLO || align=right | 1.6 km || 
|-id=236 bgcolor=#d6d6d6
| 58236 ||  || — || March 17, 1993 || La Silla || UESAC || — || align=right | 6.6 km || 
|-id=237 bgcolor=#d6d6d6
| 58237 ||  || — || March 21, 1993 || La Silla || UESAC || — || align=right | 5.1 km || 
|-id=238 bgcolor=#d6d6d6
| 58238 ||  || — || March 21, 1993 || La Silla || UESAC || — || align=right | 8.6 km || 
|-id=239 bgcolor=#d6d6d6
| 58239 ||  || — || March 21, 1993 || La Silla || UESAC || — || align=right | 7.9 km || 
|-id=240 bgcolor=#fefefe
| 58240 ||  || — || March 18, 1993 || La Silla || UESAC || SUL || align=right | 4.9 km || 
|-id=241 bgcolor=#E9E9E9
| 58241 ||  || — || April 21, 1993 || Kitt Peak || Spacewatch || BRU || align=right | 4.8 km || 
|-id=242 bgcolor=#d6d6d6
| 58242 ||  || — || April 21, 1993 || Kitt Peak || Spacewatch || — || align=right | 9.2 km || 
|-id=243 bgcolor=#fefefe
| 58243 ||  || — || July 12, 1993 || La Silla || E. W. Elst || V || align=right | 2.0 km || 
|-id=244 bgcolor=#fefefe
| 58244 ||  || — || July 20, 1993 || La Silla || E. W. Elst || V || align=right | 2.4 km || 
|-id=245 bgcolor=#fefefe
| 58245 ||  || — || July 20, 1993 || La Silla || E. W. Elst || V || align=right | 2.0 km || 
|-id=246 bgcolor=#fefefe
| 58246 ||  || — || July 19, 1993 || La Silla || E. W. Elst || — || align=right | 2.4 km || 
|-id=247 bgcolor=#fefefe
| 58247 ||  || — || August 14, 1993 || Caussols || E. W. Elst || — || align=right | 1.5 km || 
|-id=248 bgcolor=#d6d6d6
| 58248 ||  || — || August 15, 1993 || Caussols || E. W. Elst || — || align=right | 5.4 km || 
|-id=249 bgcolor=#fefefe
| 58249 ||  || — || August 15, 1993 || Caussols || E. W. Elst || PHO || align=right | 3.1 km || 
|-id=250 bgcolor=#fefefe
| 58250 ||  || — || August 16, 1993 || Caussols || E. W. Elst || — || align=right | 2.7 km || 
|-id=251 bgcolor=#fefefe
| 58251 ||  || — || August 16, 1993 || Caussols || E. W. Elst || NYS || align=right | 1.5 km || 
|-id=252 bgcolor=#fefefe
| 58252 ||  || — || August 18, 1993 || Caussols || E. W. Elst || NYS || align=right | 1.7 km || 
|-id=253 bgcolor=#fefefe
| 58253 ||  || — || August 17, 1993 || Caussols || E. W. Elst || FLO || align=right | 1.5 km || 
|-id=254 bgcolor=#fefefe
| 58254 ||  || — || August 17, 1993 || Caussols || E. W. Elst || — || align=right | 1.5 km || 
|-id=255 bgcolor=#fefefe
| 58255 ||  || — || September 15, 1993 || La Silla || E. W. Elst || FLO || align=right | 4.8 km || 
|-id=256 bgcolor=#d6d6d6
| 58256 ||  || — || September 15, 1993 || La Silla || E. W. Elst || THM || align=right | 6.3 km || 
|-id=257 bgcolor=#fefefe
| 58257 ||  || — || September 14, 1993 || La Silla || H. Debehogne, E. W. Elst || NYS || align=right | 2.4 km || 
|-id=258 bgcolor=#d6d6d6
| 58258 ||  || — || September 14, 1993 || La Silla || H. Debehogne, E. W. Elst || KOR || align=right | 3.4 km || 
|-id=259 bgcolor=#E9E9E9
| 58259 ||  || — || September 14, 1993 || La Silla || H. Debehogne, E. W. Elst || — || align=right | 2.8 km || 
|-id=260 bgcolor=#fefefe
| 58260 || 1993 SO || — || September 18, 1993 || Kitt Peak || Spacewatch || — || align=right | 3.0 km || 
|-id=261 bgcolor=#fefefe
| 58261 ||  || — || September 16, 1993 || Kitami || K. Endate, K. Watanabe || NYS || align=right | 6.3 km || 
|-id=262 bgcolor=#fefefe
| 58262 ||  || — || September 19, 1993 || Kitami || K. Endate, K. Watanabe || FLO || align=right | 1.7 km || 
|-id=263 bgcolor=#fefefe
| 58263 ||  || — || September 19, 1993 || Caussols || E. W. Elst || — || align=right | 3.2 km || 
|-id=264 bgcolor=#E9E9E9
| 58264 ||  || — || September 17, 1993 || La Silla || E. W. Elst || — || align=right | 2.1 km || 
|-id=265 bgcolor=#fefefe
| 58265 ||  || — || October 14, 1993 || Palomar || H. E. Holt || — || align=right | 2.2 km || 
|-id=266 bgcolor=#fefefe
| 58266 ||  || — || October 9, 1993 || La Silla || E. W. Elst || MAS || align=right | 1.9 km || 
|-id=267 bgcolor=#d6d6d6
| 58267 ||  || — || October 9, 1993 || La Silla || E. W. Elst || — || align=right | 8.4 km || 
|-id=268 bgcolor=#fefefe
| 58268 ||  || — || October 9, 1993 || La Silla || E. W. Elst || V || align=right | 1.5 km || 
|-id=269 bgcolor=#fefefe
| 58269 ||  || — || October 9, 1993 || La Silla || E. W. Elst || NYS || align=right | 2.1 km || 
|-id=270 bgcolor=#fefefe
| 58270 ||  || — || October 9, 1993 || La Silla || E. W. Elst || NYS || align=right | 1.9 km || 
|-id=271 bgcolor=#fefefe
| 58271 ||  || — || October 9, 1993 || La Silla || E. W. Elst || V || align=right | 2.3 km || 
|-id=272 bgcolor=#E9E9E9
| 58272 ||  || — || October 9, 1993 || La Silla || E. W. Elst || — || align=right | 2.1 km || 
|-id=273 bgcolor=#E9E9E9
| 58273 ||  || — || October 9, 1993 || La Silla || E. W. Elst || — || align=right | 3.2 km || 
|-id=274 bgcolor=#E9E9E9
| 58274 ||  || — || October 9, 1993 || La Silla || E. W. Elst || ADE || align=right | 7.7 km || 
|-id=275 bgcolor=#fefefe
| 58275 ||  || — || October 9, 1993 || La Silla || E. W. Elst || — || align=right | 1.8 km || 
|-id=276 bgcolor=#fefefe
| 58276 ||  || — || October 9, 1993 || La Silla || E. W. Elst || NYS || align=right | 3.0 km || 
|-id=277 bgcolor=#E9E9E9
| 58277 ||  || — || October 9, 1993 || La Silla || E. W. Elst || — || align=right | 6.1 km || 
|-id=278 bgcolor=#fefefe
| 58278 ||  || — || October 9, 1993 || La Silla || E. W. Elst || — || align=right | 2.0 km || 
|-id=279 bgcolor=#d6d6d6
| 58279 Kamerlingh ||  ||  || October 11, 1993 || La Silla || E. W. Elst || 3:2 || align=right | 11 km || 
|-id=280 bgcolor=#fefefe
| 58280 ||  || — || October 20, 1993 || Kitt Peak || Spacewatch || SUL || align=right | 4.5 km || 
|-id=281 bgcolor=#fefefe
| 58281 ||  || — || October 20, 1993 || La Silla || E. W. Elst || FLO || align=right | 1.6 km || 
|-id=282 bgcolor=#fefefe
| 58282 ||  || — || October 20, 1993 || La Silla || E. W. Elst || — || align=right | 2.3 km || 
|-id=283 bgcolor=#fefefe
| 58283 ||  || — || October 20, 1993 || La Silla || E. W. Elst || V || align=right | 1.3 km || 
|-id=284 bgcolor=#fefefe
| 58284 ||  || — || November 14, 1993 || Nyukasa || M. Hirasawa, S. Suzuki || — || align=right | 5.1 km || 
|-id=285 bgcolor=#FA8072
| 58285 || 1993 YN || — || December 16, 1993 || Farra d'Isonzo || Farra d'Isonzo || — || align=right | 2.8 km || 
|-id=286 bgcolor=#E9E9E9
| 58286 ||  || — || December 16, 1993 || Kitt Peak || Spacewatch || — || align=right | 2.2 km || 
|-id=287 bgcolor=#E9E9E9
| 58287 ||  || — || January 7, 1994 || Oizumi || T. Kobayashi || GER || align=right | 6.0 km || 
|-id=288 bgcolor=#E9E9E9
| 58288 ||  || — || February 8, 1994 || La Silla || E. W. Elst || — || align=right | 6.0 km || 
|-id=289 bgcolor=#E9E9E9
| 58289 ||  || — || February 8, 1994 || La Silla || E. W. Elst || — || align=right | 3.9 km || 
|-id=290 bgcolor=#E9E9E9
| 58290 ||  || — || February 8, 1994 || La Silla || E. W. Elst || — || align=right | 5.0 km || 
|-id=291 bgcolor=#E9E9E9
| 58291 || 1994 GA || — || April 1, 1994 || Siding Spring || R. H. McNaught || BRU || align=right | 9.1 km || 
|-id=292 bgcolor=#d6d6d6
| 58292 || 1994 GC || — || April 2, 1994 || Stroncone || A. Vagnozzi || KOR || align=right | 4.3 km || 
|-id=293 bgcolor=#E9E9E9
| 58293 ||  || — || April 6, 1994 || Kitt Peak || Spacewatch || — || align=right | 3.1 km || 
|-id=294 bgcolor=#E9E9E9
| 58294 ||  || — || May 4, 1994 || Kitt Peak || Spacewatch || — || align=right | 5.6 km || 
|-id=295 bgcolor=#E9E9E9
| 58295 ||  || — || May 15, 1994 || Palomar || C. P. de Saint-Aignan || — || align=right | 4.6 km || 
|-id=296 bgcolor=#E9E9E9
| 58296 ||  || — || June 2, 1994 || Siding Spring || R. H. McNaught || PAL || align=right | 7.3 km || 
|-id=297 bgcolor=#d6d6d6
| 58297 ||  || — || August 10, 1994 || La Silla || E. W. Elst || — || align=right | 6.7 km || 
|-id=298 bgcolor=#fefefe
| 58298 ||  || — || August 10, 1994 || La Silla || E. W. Elst || V || align=right | 2.0 km || 
|-id=299 bgcolor=#d6d6d6
| 58299 ||  || — || August 10, 1994 || La Silla || E. W. Elst || EOS || align=right | 6.0 km || 
|-id=300 bgcolor=#d6d6d6
| 58300 ||  || — || August 10, 1994 || La Silla || E. W. Elst || HYG || align=right | 5.7 km || 
|}

58301–58400 

|-bgcolor=#fefefe
| 58301 ||  || — || August 10, 1994 || La Silla || E. W. Elst || — || align=right | 2.1 km || 
|-id=302 bgcolor=#d6d6d6
| 58302 ||  || — || August 10, 1994 || La Silla || E. W. Elst || THM || align=right | 6.9 km || 
|-id=303 bgcolor=#fefefe
| 58303 ||  || — || August 10, 1994 || La Silla || E. W. Elst || — || align=right | 1.7 km || 
|-id=304 bgcolor=#fefefe
| 58304 ||  || — || August 10, 1994 || La Silla || E. W. Elst || FLO || align=right | 1.5 km || 
|-id=305 bgcolor=#d6d6d6
| 58305 ||  || — || August 10, 1994 || La Silla || E. W. Elst || — || align=right | 6.2 km || 
|-id=306 bgcolor=#E9E9E9
| 58306 ||  || — || August 10, 1994 || La Silla || E. W. Elst || — || align=right | 1.3 km || 
|-id=307 bgcolor=#d6d6d6
| 58307 ||  || — || August 10, 1994 || La Silla || E. W. Elst || — || align=right | 6.8 km || 
|-id=308 bgcolor=#E9E9E9
| 58308 ||  || — || August 10, 1994 || La Silla || E. W. Elst || — || align=right | 2.4 km || 
|-id=309 bgcolor=#fefefe
| 58309 ||  || — || August 10, 1994 || La Silla || E. W. Elst || — || align=right | 1.7 km || 
|-id=310 bgcolor=#E9E9E9
| 58310 ||  || — || August 12, 1994 || La Silla || E. W. Elst || — || align=right | 2.2 km || 
|-id=311 bgcolor=#fefefe
| 58311 ||  || — || August 12, 1994 || La Silla || E. W. Elst || NYS || align=right | 3.5 km || 
|-id=312 bgcolor=#fefefe
| 58312 ||  || — || August 12, 1994 || La Silla || E. W. Elst || — || align=right | 2.6 km || 
|-id=313 bgcolor=#d6d6d6
| 58313 ||  || — || August 12, 1994 || La Silla || E. W. Elst || — || align=right | 6.2 km || 
|-id=314 bgcolor=#fefefe
| 58314 ||  || — || August 12, 1994 || La Silla || E. W. Elst || — || align=right | 1.6 km || 
|-id=315 bgcolor=#fefefe
| 58315 ||  || — || August 12, 1994 || La Silla || E. W. Elst || FLO || align=right | 1.5 km || 
|-id=316 bgcolor=#fefefe
| 58316 ||  || — || August 12, 1994 || La Silla || E. W. Elst || — || align=right | 1.5 km || 
|-id=317 bgcolor=#fefefe
| 58317 ||  || — || August 12, 1994 || La Silla || E. W. Elst || — || align=right | 1.4 km || 
|-id=318 bgcolor=#d6d6d6
| 58318 ||  || — || August 10, 1994 || La Silla || E. W. Elst || HYG || align=right | 3.9 km || 
|-id=319 bgcolor=#d6d6d6
| 58319 ||  || — || August 10, 1994 || La Silla || E. W. Elst || — || align=right | 6.8 km || 
|-id=320 bgcolor=#d6d6d6
| 58320 ||  || — || August 10, 1994 || La Silla || E. W. Elst || — || align=right | 6.0 km || 
|-id=321 bgcolor=#d6d6d6
| 58321 ||  || — || August 10, 1994 || La Silla || E. W. Elst || THM || align=right | 5.9 km || 
|-id=322 bgcolor=#fefefe
| 58322 ||  || — || August 10, 1994 || La Silla || E. W. Elst || — || align=right | 3.4 km || 
|-id=323 bgcolor=#d6d6d6
| 58323 ||  || — || August 10, 1994 || La Silla || E. W. Elst || — || align=right | 6.8 km || 
|-id=324 bgcolor=#fefefe
| 58324 ||  || — || September 12, 1994 || Kitt Peak || Spacewatch || ERI || align=right | 3.2 km || 
|-id=325 bgcolor=#FA8072
| 58325 ||  || — || September 11, 1994 || Siding Spring || R. H. McNaught || — || align=right | 2.2 km || 
|-id=326 bgcolor=#d6d6d6
| 58326 ||  || — || September 3, 1994 || La Silla || E. W. Elst || KOR || align=right | 3.6 km || 
|-id=327 bgcolor=#d6d6d6
| 58327 ||  || — || September 28, 1994 || Kitt Peak || Spacewatch || HYG || align=right | 6.9 km || 
|-id=328 bgcolor=#fefefe
| 58328 ||  || — || September 28, 1994 || Kitt Peak || Spacewatch || — || align=right | 1.7 km || 
|-id=329 bgcolor=#d6d6d6
| 58329 ||  || — || September 29, 1994 || Kitt Peak || Spacewatch || THM || align=right | 5.7 km || 
|-id=330 bgcolor=#E9E9E9
| 58330 || 1994 TK || — || October 3, 1994 || Siding Spring || R. H. McNaught || BAR || align=right | 4.0 km || 
|-id=331 bgcolor=#E9E9E9
| 58331 ||  || — || October 9, 1994 || Kitt Peak || Spacewatch || KON || align=right | 3.6 km || 
|-id=332 bgcolor=#fefefe
| 58332 || 1994 UR || — || October 31, 1994 || Oizumi || T. Kobayashi || NYS || align=right | 2.0 km || 
|-id=333 bgcolor=#fefefe
| 58333 ||  || — || October 25, 1994 || Kushiro || S. Ueda, H. Kaneda || — || align=right | 1.9 km || 
|-id=334 bgcolor=#fefefe
| 58334 ||  || — || October 28, 1994 || Kitt Peak || Spacewatch || — || align=right | 1.4 km || 
|-id=335 bgcolor=#E9E9E9
| 58335 ||  || — || October 31, 1994 || Kitt Peak || Spacewatch || — || align=right | 3.2 km || 
|-id=336 bgcolor=#fefefe
| 58336 || 1994 VP || — || November 1, 1994 || Oizumi || T. Kobayashi || — || align=right | 2.4 km || 
|-id=337 bgcolor=#fefefe
| 58337 || 1994 WV || — || November 25, 1994 || Oizumi || T. Kobayashi || — || align=right | 2.1 km || 
|-id=338 bgcolor=#fefefe
| 58338 ||  || — || November 27, 1994 || Kitt Peak || Spacewatch || — || align=right | 4.7 km || 
|-id=339 bgcolor=#fefefe
| 58339 ||  || — || November 27, 1994 || Caussols || E. W. Elst || FLO || align=right | 2.1 km || 
|-id=340 bgcolor=#fefefe
| 58340 ||  || — || December 31, 1994 || Oizumi || T. Kobayashi || — || align=right | 2.8 km || 
|-id=341 bgcolor=#fefefe
| 58341 ||  || — || December 31, 1994 || Oizumi || T. Kobayashi || NYS || align=right | 2.1 km || 
|-id=342 bgcolor=#fefefe
| 58342 ||  || — || December 31, 1994 || Oizumi || T. Kobayashi || V || align=right | 2.6 km || 
|-id=343 bgcolor=#fefefe
| 58343 ||  || — || January 23, 1995 || Kitt Peak || Spacewatch || — || align=right | 2.0 km || 
|-id=344 bgcolor=#fefefe
| 58344 ||  || — || January 31, 1995 || Kitt Peak || Spacewatch || — || align=right | 3.6 km || 
|-id=345 bgcolor=#fefefe
| 58345 Moomintroll ||  ||  || February 7, 1995 || Siding Spring || D. J. Asher || H || align=right | 1.2 km || 
|-id=346 bgcolor=#fefefe
| 58346 ||  || — || February 1, 1995 || Kitt Peak || Spacewatch || — || align=right | 1.5 km || 
|-id=347 bgcolor=#E9E9E9
| 58347 ||  || — || February 2, 1995 || Kitt Peak || Spacewatch || — || align=right | 2.5 km || 
|-id=348 bgcolor=#fefefe
| 58348 ||  || — || February 2, 1995 || Kitt Peak || Spacewatch || NYS || align=right | 1.9 km || 
|-id=349 bgcolor=#fefefe
| 58349 ||  || — || February 22, 1995 || Kitt Peak || Spacewatch || NYS || align=right | 3.9 km || 
|-id=350 bgcolor=#E9E9E9
| 58350 ||  || — || February 24, 1995 || Kitt Peak || Spacewatch || — || align=right | 1.6 km || 
|-id=351 bgcolor=#fefefe
| 58351 ||  || — || February 24, 1995 || Kitt Peak || Spacewatch || — || align=right | 1.7 km || 
|-id=352 bgcolor=#fefefe
| 58352 ||  || — || March 1, 1995 || Kitt Peak || Spacewatch || NYS || align=right | 1.4 km || 
|-id=353 bgcolor=#d6d6d6
| 58353 ||  || — || March 2, 1995 || Kitt Peak || Spacewatch || 3:2 || align=right | 7.4 km || 
|-id=354 bgcolor=#E9E9E9
| 58354 ||  || — || March 2, 1995 || Kitt Peak || Spacewatch || — || align=right | 2.3 km || 
|-id=355 bgcolor=#E9E9E9
| 58355 || 1995 FN || — || March 26, 1995 || Nachi-Katsuura || Y. Shimizu, T. Urata || JUN || align=right | 3.3 km || 
|-id=356 bgcolor=#E9E9E9
| 58356 ||  || — || March 23, 1995 || Kitt Peak || Spacewatch || — || align=right | 4.0 km || 
|-id=357 bgcolor=#E9E9E9
| 58357 ||  || — || April 24, 1995 || Kitt Peak || Spacewatch || EUN || align=right | 6.8 km || 
|-id=358 bgcolor=#E9E9E9
| 58358 ||  || — || April 26, 1995 || Kitt Peak || Spacewatch || — || align=right | 1.8 km || 
|-id=359 bgcolor=#E9E9E9
| 58359 ||  || — || May 26, 1995 || Kitt Peak || Spacewatch || — || align=right | 2.3 km || 
|-id=360 bgcolor=#d6d6d6
| 58360 || 1995 LM || — || June 3, 1995 || Kitt Peak || Spacewatch || EOS || align=right | 5.3 km || 
|-id=361 bgcolor=#E9E9E9
| 58361 ||  || — || June 25, 1995 || Kitt Peak || Spacewatch || EUN || align=right | 2.8 km || 
|-id=362 bgcolor=#d6d6d6
| 58362 ||  || — || June 29, 1995 || Kitt Peak || Spacewatch || — || align=right | 4.7 km || 
|-id=363 bgcolor=#d6d6d6
| 58363 ||  || — || June 29, 1995 || Kitt Peak || Spacewatch || — || align=right | 7.6 km || 
|-id=364 bgcolor=#E9E9E9
| 58364 Feierberg ||  ||  || June 25, 1995 || Kitt Peak || Spacewatch || RAF || align=right | 1.8 km || 
|-id=365 bgcolor=#E9E9E9
| 58365 Robmedrano || 1995 OQ ||  || July 27, 1995 || Haleakala || AMOS || — || align=right | 2.7 km || 
|-id=366 bgcolor=#C2FFFF
| 58366 ||  || — || July 25, 1995 || Kitt Peak || Spacewatch || L4 || align=right | 11 km || 
|-id=367 bgcolor=#E9E9E9
| 58367 || 1995 QL || — || August 19, 1995 || Church Stretton || S. P. Laurie || — || align=right | 3.6 km || 
|-id=368 bgcolor=#E9E9E9
| 58368 ||  || — || August 19, 1995 || Xinglong || SCAP || — || align=right | 4.9 km || 
|-id=369 bgcolor=#d6d6d6
| 58369 ||  || — || August 30, 1995 || Pleiade || Pleiade Obs. || THM || align=right | 7.2 km || 
|-id=370 bgcolor=#d6d6d6
| 58370 ||  || — || August 22, 1995 || Kitt Peak || Spacewatch || — || align=right | 7.7 km || 
|-id=371 bgcolor=#E9E9E9
| 58371 ||  || — || August 25, 1995 || Kitt Peak || Spacewatch || MAR || align=right | 2.5 km || 
|-id=372 bgcolor=#fefefe
| 58372 || 1995 SQ || — || September 18, 1995 || Ondřejov || L. Kotková || MAS || align=right | 1.5 km || 
|-id=373 bgcolor=#E9E9E9
| 58373 Albertoalonso || 1995 SR ||  || September 19, 1995 || Catalina Station || T. B. Spahr || — || align=right | 8.2 km || 
|-id=374 bgcolor=#fefefe
| 58374 ||  || — || September 20, 1995 || Kitami || K. Endate, K. Watanabe || — || align=right | 3.8 km || 
|-id=375 bgcolor=#d6d6d6
| 58375 ||  || — || September 19, 1995 || Kitt Peak || Spacewatch || VER || align=right | 6.9 km || 
|-id=376 bgcolor=#d6d6d6
| 58376 ||  || — || September 19, 1995 || Kitt Peak || Spacewatch || — || align=right | 4.5 km || 
|-id=377 bgcolor=#fefefe
| 58377 ||  || — || September 19, 1995 || Kitt Peak || Spacewatch || NYS || align=right | 1.3 km || 
|-id=378 bgcolor=#E9E9E9
| 58378 ||  || — || September 19, 1995 || Kitt Peak || Spacewatch || — || align=right | 4.7 km || 
|-id=379 bgcolor=#fefefe
| 58379 ||  || — || September 19, 1995 || Kitt Peak || Spacewatch || V || align=right | 1.4 km || 
|-id=380 bgcolor=#d6d6d6
| 58380 ||  || — || September 21, 1995 || Kitt Peak || Spacewatch || — || align=right | 4.6 km || 
|-id=381 bgcolor=#d6d6d6
| 58381 ||  || — || September 24, 1995 || Kitt Peak || Spacewatch || EOS || align=right | 3.8 km || 
|-id=382 bgcolor=#d6d6d6
| 58382 ||  || — || September 25, 1995 || Kitt Peak || Spacewatch || — || align=right | 4.9 km || 
|-id=383 bgcolor=#d6d6d6
| 58383 ||  || — || September 26, 1995 || Kitt Peak || Spacewatch || — || align=right | 4.5 km || 
|-id=384 bgcolor=#d6d6d6
| 58384 ||  || — || September 26, 1995 || Kitt Peak || Spacewatch || THM || align=right | 5.7 km || 
|-id=385 bgcolor=#d6d6d6
| 58385 ||  || — || September 28, 1995 || Xinglong || SCAP || BRA || align=right | 2.4 km || 
|-id=386 bgcolor=#fefefe
| 58386 ||  || — || September 28, 1995 || Xinglong || SCAP || — || align=right | 1.6 km || 
|-id=387 bgcolor=#d6d6d6
| 58387 ||  || — || September 20, 1995 || Kitt Peak || Spacewatch || KOR || align=right | 2.2 km || 
|-id=388 bgcolor=#E9E9E9
| 58388 || 1995 TK || — || October 2, 1995 || Kitt Peak || Spacewatch || — || align=right | 4.2 km || 
|-id=389 bgcolor=#E9E9E9
| 58389 ||  || — || October 14, 1995 || Xinglong || SCAP || AEO || align=right | 3.8 km || 
|-id=390 bgcolor=#d6d6d6
| 58390 ||  || — || October 15, 1995 || Kitt Peak || Spacewatch || — || align=right | 4.1 km || 
|-id=391 bgcolor=#E9E9E9
| 58391 ||  || — || October 20, 1995 || Oizumi || T. Kobayashi || — || align=right | 6.8 km || 
|-id=392 bgcolor=#d6d6d6
| 58392 ||  || — || October 17, 1995 || Kitt Peak || Spacewatch || — || align=right | 3.5 km || 
|-id=393 bgcolor=#d6d6d6
| 58393 ||  || — || October 17, 1995 || Kitt Peak || Spacewatch || THM || align=right | 3.2 km || 
|-id=394 bgcolor=#E9E9E9
| 58394 ||  || — || October 19, 1995 || Kitt Peak || Spacewatch || — || align=right | 3.1 km || 
|-id=395 bgcolor=#d6d6d6
| 58395 ||  || — || October 19, 1995 || Kitt Peak || Spacewatch || — || align=right | 4.0 km || 
|-id=396 bgcolor=#d6d6d6
| 58396 ||  || — || October 25, 1995 || Kitt Peak || Spacewatch || — || align=right | 5.2 km || 
|-id=397 bgcolor=#d6d6d6
| 58397 ||  || — || November 14, 1995 || Kitt Peak || Spacewatch || — || align=right | 4.7 km || 
|-id=398 bgcolor=#fefefe
| 58398 ||  || — || November 14, 1995 || Kitt Peak || Spacewatch || — || align=right | 1.6 km || 
|-id=399 bgcolor=#fefefe
| 58399 ||  || — || November 14, 1995 || Kitt Peak || Spacewatch || — || align=right | 3.2 km || 
|-id=400 bgcolor=#d6d6d6
| 58400 ||  || — || November 15, 1995 || Kitt Peak || Spacewatch || KOR || align=right | 2.5 km || 
|}

58401–58500 

|-bgcolor=#d6d6d6
| 58401 ||  || — || November 15, 1995 || Kitt Peak || Spacewatch || — || align=right | 3.2 km || 
|-id=402 bgcolor=#E9E9E9
| 58402 ||  || — || November 15, 1995 || Kitt Peak || Spacewatch || — || align=right | 1.6 km || 
|-id=403 bgcolor=#d6d6d6
| 58403 ||  || — || November 16, 1995 || Church Stretton || S. P. Laurie || HYG || align=right | 7.3 km || 
|-id=404 bgcolor=#d6d6d6
| 58404 ||  || — || November 27, 1995 || Oizumi || T. Kobayashi || MEL || align=right | 6.7 km || 
|-id=405 bgcolor=#E9E9E9
| 58405 ||  || — || November 16, 1995 || Kitt Peak || Spacewatch || — || align=right | 2.8 km || 
|-id=406 bgcolor=#fefefe
| 58406 ||  || — || November 17, 1995 || Kitt Peak || Spacewatch || NYS || align=right | 1.1 km || 
|-id=407 bgcolor=#fefefe
| 58407 ||  || — || November 20, 1995 || Kitt Peak || Spacewatch || — || align=right | 1.2 km || 
|-id=408 bgcolor=#fefefe
| 58408 || 1995 XU || — || December 12, 1995 || Oizumi || T. Kobayashi || NYS || align=right | 1.7 km || 
|-id=409 bgcolor=#fefefe
| 58409 ||  || — || December 14, 1995 || Kitt Peak || Spacewatch || FLO || align=right | 1.0 km || 
|-id=410 bgcolor=#fefefe
| 58410 || 1995 YS || — || December 17, 1995 || Chichibu || N. Satō, T. Urata || — || align=right | 2.5 km || 
|-id=411 bgcolor=#fefefe
| 58411 ||  || — || December 21, 1995 || Haleakala || NEAT || PHO || align=right | 2.2 km || 
|-id=412 bgcolor=#d6d6d6
| 58412 ||  || — || December 26, 1995 || Oizumi || T. Kobayashi || — || align=right | 8.2 km || 
|-id=413 bgcolor=#fefefe
| 58413 ||  || — || December 18, 1995 || Kitt Peak || Spacewatch || — || align=right | 1.4 km || 
|-id=414 bgcolor=#fefefe
| 58414 ||  || — || December 19, 1995 || Kitt Peak || Spacewatch || V || align=right | 1.6 km || 
|-id=415 bgcolor=#fefefe
| 58415 || 1996 AM || — || January 11, 1996 || Oizumi || T. Kobayashi || — || align=right | 2.5 km || 
|-id=416 bgcolor=#fefefe
| 58416 ||  || — || January 23, 1996 || Oizumi || T. Kobayashi || — || align=right | 2.1 km || 
|-id=417 bgcolor=#fefefe
| 58417 Belzoni ||  ||  || January 25, 1996 || Colleverde || V. S. Casulli || — || align=right | 1.8 km || 
|-id=418 bgcolor=#d6d6d6
| 58418 Luguhu ||  ||  || January 26, 1996 || Xinglong || Xinglong Stn. || EUP || align=right | 9.4 km || 
|-id=419 bgcolor=#fefefe
| 58419 ||  || — || January 26, 1996 || Siding Spring || R. H. McNaught || PHO || align=right | 4.0 km || 
|-id=420 bgcolor=#fefefe
| 58420 ||  || — || January 16, 1996 || Kitt Peak || Spacewatch || — || align=right | 1.8 km || 
|-id=421 bgcolor=#d6d6d6
| 58421 ||  || — || January 18, 1996 || Kitt Peak || Spacewatch || — || align=right | 6.2 km || 
|-id=422 bgcolor=#E9E9E9
| 58422 ||  || — || January 21, 1996 || Kitt Peak || Spacewatch || — || align=right | 2.3 km || 
|-id=423 bgcolor=#fefefe
| 58423 ||  || — || January 24, 1996 || Kitt Peak || Spacewatch || — || align=right | 3.0 km || 
|-id=424 bgcolor=#E9E9E9
| 58424 Jamesdunlop ||  ||  || February 22, 1996 || Kleť || M. Tichý, Z. Moravec || — || align=right | 2.5 km || 
|-id=425 bgcolor=#fefefe
| 58425 ||  || — || February 20, 1996 || Church Stretton || S. P. Laurie || FLO || align=right | 1.9 km || 
|-id=426 bgcolor=#fefefe
| 58426 ||  || — || March 15, 1996 || Haleakala || NEAT || — || align=right | 1.9 km || 
|-id=427 bgcolor=#E9E9E9
| 58427 ||  || — || March 11, 1996 || Kitt Peak || Spacewatch || AGN || align=right | 2.7 km || 
|-id=428 bgcolor=#fefefe
| 58428 ||  || — || March 11, 1996 || Kitt Peak || Spacewatch || — || align=right | 1.3 km || 
|-id=429 bgcolor=#fefefe
| 58429 || 1996 FH || — || March 16, 1996 || Haleakala || NEAT || — || align=right | 2.7 km || 
|-id=430 bgcolor=#fefefe
| 58430 ||  || — || March 20, 1996 || Haleakala || NEAT || — || align=right | 2.4 km || 
|-id=431 bgcolor=#fefefe
| 58431 ||  || — || March 21, 1996 || Haleakala || NEAT || — || align=right | 2.8 km || 
|-id=432 bgcolor=#fefefe
| 58432 ||  || — || March 22, 1996 || La Silla || E. W. Elst || V || align=right | 1.8 km || 
|-id=433 bgcolor=#fefefe
| 58433 ||  || — || March 22, 1996 || La Silla || E. W. Elst || FLO || align=right | 2.4 km || 
|-id=434 bgcolor=#fefefe
| 58434 ||  || — || March 23, 1996 || Haleakala || NEAT || FLO || align=right | 1.9 km || 
|-id=435 bgcolor=#fefefe
| 58435 ||  || — || April 11, 1996 || Kitt Peak || Spacewatch || — || align=right | 1.6 km || 
|-id=436 bgcolor=#fefefe
| 58436 ||  || — || April 11, 1996 || Kitt Peak || Spacewatch || — || align=right | 1.8 km || 
|-id=437 bgcolor=#fefefe
| 58437 ||  || — || April 13, 1996 || Kitt Peak || Spacewatch || — || align=right | 1.5 km || 
|-id=438 bgcolor=#fefefe
| 58438 ||  || — || April 13, 1996 || Kitt Peak || Spacewatch || — || align=right | 1.5 km || 
|-id=439 bgcolor=#fefefe
| 58439 ||  || — || April 15, 1996 || La Silla || E. W. Elst || — || align=right | 1.6 km || 
|-id=440 bgcolor=#E9E9E9
| 58440 Zdeněkstuchlík || 1996 HV ||  || April 21, 1996 || Ondřejov || P. Pravec, L. Kotková || DOR || align=right | 5.9 km || 
|-id=441 bgcolor=#E9E9E9
| 58441 Thomastestoni ||  ||  || April 19, 1996 || Bologna || San Vittore Obs. || — || align=right | 3.8 km || 
|-id=442 bgcolor=#fefefe
| 58442 ||  || — || April 17, 1996 || La Silla || E. W. Elst || — || align=right | 1.4 km || 
|-id=443 bgcolor=#fefefe
| 58443 ||  || — || April 17, 1996 || La Silla || E. W. Elst || KLI || align=right | 5.0 km || 
|-id=444 bgcolor=#fefefe
| 58444 ||  || — || April 17, 1996 || La Silla || E. W. Elst || — || align=right | 1.5 km || 
|-id=445 bgcolor=#fefefe
| 58445 ||  || — || April 18, 1996 || La Silla || E. W. Elst || — || align=right | 3.7 km || 
|-id=446 bgcolor=#E9E9E9
| 58446 ||  || — || April 18, 1996 || La Silla || E. W. Elst || — || align=right | 5.7 km || 
|-id=447 bgcolor=#fefefe
| 58447 ||  || — || April 20, 1996 || La Silla || E. W. Elst || NYS || align=right | 4.0 km || 
|-id=448 bgcolor=#fefefe
| 58448 ||  || — || April 20, 1996 || La Silla || E. W. Elst || — || align=right | 4.6 km || 
|-id=449 bgcolor=#fefefe
| 58449 ||  || — || April 20, 1996 || La Silla || E. W. Elst || NYS || align=right | 2.0 km || 
|-id=450 bgcolor=#fefefe
| 58450 ||  || — || May 13, 1996 || Haleakala || NEAT || PHO || align=right | 2.8 km || 
|-id=451 bgcolor=#fefefe
| 58451 ||  || — || May 9, 1996 || Kitt Peak || Spacewatch || V || align=right | 3.5 km || 
|-id=452 bgcolor=#fefefe
| 58452 ||  || — || May 9, 1996 || Kitt Peak || Spacewatch || — || align=right | 1.6 km || 
|-id=453 bgcolor=#fefefe
| 58453 ||  || — || May 10, 1996 || Kitt Peak || Spacewatch || — || align=right | 1.8 km || 
|-id=454 bgcolor=#fefefe
| 58454 ||  || — || May 12, 1996 || Kitt Peak || Spacewatch || V || align=right | 2.2 km || 
|-id=455 bgcolor=#fefefe
| 58455 ||  || — || May 9, 1996 || Kitt Peak || Spacewatch || — || align=right | 1.2 km || 
|-id=456 bgcolor=#fefefe
| 58456 ||  || — || May 12, 1996 || Kitt Peak || Spacewatch || NYS || align=right | 1.4 km || 
|-id=457 bgcolor=#fefefe
| 58457 ||  || — || May 12, 1996 || Kitt Peak || Spacewatch || V || align=right | 2.0 km || 
|-id=458 bgcolor=#fefefe
| 58458 || 1996 KP || — || May 21, 1996 || Prescott || P. G. Comba || KLI || align=right | 4.5 km || 
|-id=459 bgcolor=#fefefe
| 58459 ||  || — || May 22, 1996 || La Silla || E. W. Elst || — || align=right | 1.5 km || 
|-id=460 bgcolor=#fefefe
| 58460 Le Mouélic ||  ||  || June 13, 1996 || Haleakala || NEAT || — || align=right | 5.2 km || 
|-id=461 bgcolor=#E9E9E9
| 58461 || 1996 ML || — || June 22, 1996 || Prescott || P. G. Comba || — || align=right | 4.9 km || 
|-id=462 bgcolor=#d6d6d6
| 58462 || 1996 NR || — || July 14, 1996 || Needville || Needville Obs. || — || align=right | 7.1 km || 
|-id=463 bgcolor=#E9E9E9
| 58463 ||  || — || July 14, 1996 || Haleakala || NEAT || — || align=right | 2.6 km || 
|-id=464 bgcolor=#fefefe
| 58464 ||  || — || July 14, 1996 || La Silla || E. W. Elst || NYS || align=right | 1.4 km || 
|-id=465 bgcolor=#E9E9E9
| 58465 ||  || — || July 14, 1996 || La Silla || E. W. Elst || — || align=right | 2.8 km || 
|-id=466 bgcolor=#fefefe
| 58466 Santoka ||  ||  || July 23, 1996 || Kuma Kogen || A. Nakamura || NYS || align=right data-sort-value="0.97" | 970 m || 
|-id=467 bgcolor=#fefefe
| 58467 ||  || — || August 14, 1996 || Haleakala || NEAT || MAS || align=right | 2.0 km || 
|-id=468 bgcolor=#fefefe
| 58468 || 1996 QA || — || August 16, 1996 || Haleakala || NEAT || H || align=right | 1.2 km || 
|-id=469 bgcolor=#fefefe
| 58469 || 1996 RC || — || September 7, 1996 || Cloudcroft || W. Offutt || — || align=right | 2.0 km || 
|-id=470 bgcolor=#fefefe
| 58470 ||  || — || September 10, 1996 || Haleakala || NEAT || — || align=right | 2.7 km || 
|-id=471 bgcolor=#E9E9E9
| 58471 ||  || — || September 13, 1996 || Haleakala || NEAT || — || align=right | 2.5 km || 
|-id=472 bgcolor=#fefefe
| 58472 ||  || — || September 13, 1996 || Haleakala || NEAT || — || align=right | 3.0 km || 
|-id=473 bgcolor=#C2FFFF
| 58473 ||  || — || September 5, 1996 || Kitt Peak || Spacewatch || L4 || align=right | 14 km || 
|-id=474 bgcolor=#fefefe
| 58474 ||  || — || September 8, 1996 || Kitt Peak || Spacewatch || ERI || align=right | 4.2 km || 
|-id=475 bgcolor=#C2FFFF
| 58475 ||  || — || September 8, 1996 || Kitt Peak || Spacewatch || L4 || align=right | 14 km || 
|-id=476 bgcolor=#d6d6d6
| 58476 ||  || — || September 8, 1996 || Kitt Peak || Spacewatch || — || align=right | 8.7 km || 
|-id=477 bgcolor=#fefefe
| 58477 ||  || — || September 14, 1996 || Haleakala || NEAT || FLO || align=right | 2.1 km || 
|-id=478 bgcolor=#C2FFFF
| 58478 ||  || — || September 11, 1996 || La Silla || UDTS || L4 || align=right | 16 km || 
|-id=479 bgcolor=#C2FFFF
| 58479 ||  || — || September 11, 1996 || La Silla || UDTS || L4 || align=right | 15 km || 
|-id=480 bgcolor=#C2FFFF
| 58480 ||  || — || September 15, 1996 || La Silla || UDTS || L4 || align=right | 18 km || 
|-id=481 bgcolor=#E9E9E9
| 58481 ||  || — || September 20, 1996 || Xinglong || SCAP || — || align=right | 1.8 km || 
|-id=482 bgcolor=#E9E9E9
| 58482 ||  || — || October 3, 1996 || Xinglong || SCAP || — || align=right | 3.8 km || 
|-id=483 bgcolor=#E9E9E9
| 58483 ||  || — || October 3, 1996 || Xinglong || SCAP || — || align=right | 3.4 km || 
|-id=484 bgcolor=#d6d6d6
| 58484 ||  || — || October 8, 1996 || Cloudcroft || W. Offutt || — || align=right | 6.0 km || 
|-id=485 bgcolor=#E9E9E9
| 58485 ||  || — || October 14, 1996 || Kitami || K. Endate, K. Watanabe || — || align=right | 3.2 km || 
|-id=486 bgcolor=#E9E9E9
| 58486 ||  || — || October 5, 1996 || Xinglong || SCAP || — || align=right | 2.4 km || 
|-id=487 bgcolor=#E9E9E9
| 58487 ||  || — || October 7, 1996 || Kitt Peak || Spacewatch || — || align=right | 3.4 km || 
|-id=488 bgcolor=#d6d6d6
| 58488 ||  || — || October 10, 1996 || Kitt Peak || Spacewatch || — || align=right | 4.8 km || 
|-id=489 bgcolor=#E9E9E9
| 58489 ||  || — || October 10, 1996 || Kitt Peak || Spacewatch || — || align=right | 4.9 km || 
|-id=490 bgcolor=#d6d6d6
| 58490 ||  || — || October 11, 1996 || Kitt Peak || Spacewatch || KOR || align=right | 3.2 km || 
|-id=491 bgcolor=#fefefe
| 58491 ||  || — || October 8, 1996 || La Silla || E. W. Elst || FLO || align=right | 1.6 km || 
|-id=492 bgcolor=#E9E9E9
| 58492 ||  || — || October 6, 1996 || Kitt Peak || Spacewatch || — || align=right | 4.5 km || 
|-id=493 bgcolor=#E9E9E9
| 58493 ||  || — || October 5, 1996 || La Silla || E. W. Elst || — || align=right | 2.3 km || 
|-id=494 bgcolor=#d6d6d6
| 58494 ||  || — || October 19, 1996 || Ondřejov || L. Kotková || EOS || align=right | 6.8 km || 
|-id=495 bgcolor=#E9E9E9
| 58495 Hajin ||  ||  || October 19, 1996 || Colleverde || V. S. Casulli || EUN || align=right | 3.9 km || 
|-id=496 bgcolor=#fefefe
| 58496 ||  || — || October 29, 1996 || Xinglong || SCAP || — || align=right | 2.4 km || 
|-id=497 bgcolor=#fefefe
| 58497 ||  || — || October 29, 1996 || Xinglong || SCAP || — || align=right | 1.6 km || 
|-id=498 bgcolor=#E9E9E9
| 58498 Octaviopaz || 1996 VF ||  || November 2, 1996 || Colleverde || V. S. Casulli || NEM || align=right | 5.0 km || 
|-id=499 bgcolor=#E9E9E9
| 58499 Stüber || 1996 VY ||  || November 3, 1996 || Linz || E. Meyer, E. Obermair || EUN || align=right | 2.5 km || 
|-id=500 bgcolor=#d6d6d6
| 58500 ||  || — || November 6, 1996 || Stroncone || A. Vagnozzi || KOR || align=right | 3.3 km || 
|}

58501–58600 

|-bgcolor=#fefefe
| 58501 ||  || — || November 10, 1996 || Sudbury || D. di Cicco || EUT || align=right | 1.8 km || 
|-id=502 bgcolor=#E9E9E9
| 58502 ||  || — || November 12, 1996 || Sudbury || D. di Cicco || — || align=right | 6.0 km || 
|-id=503 bgcolor=#d6d6d6
| 58503 ||  || — || November 12, 1996 || Sudbury || D. di Cicco || — || align=right | 5.6 km || 
|-id=504 bgcolor=#E9E9E9
| 58504 ||  || — || November 7, 1996 || Xinglong || SCAP || — || align=right | 6.1 km || 
|-id=505 bgcolor=#E9E9E9
| 58505 ||  || — || November 5, 1996 || Kitt Peak || Spacewatch || — || align=right | 3.5 km || 
|-id=506 bgcolor=#E9E9E9
| 58506 ||  || — || November 9, 1996 || Kitt Peak || Spacewatch || HNS || align=right | 2.6 km || 
|-id=507 bgcolor=#fefefe
| 58507 ||  || — || November 5, 1996 || Kitt Peak || Spacewatch || MAS || align=right | 1.9 km || 
|-id=508 bgcolor=#E9E9E9
| 58508 ||  || — || November 30, 1996 || Dossobuono || L. Lai || — || align=right | 2.5 km || 
|-id=509 bgcolor=#d6d6d6
| 58509 ||  || — || December 2, 1996 || Oizumi || T. Kobayashi || EOS || align=right | 4.8 km || 
|-id=510 bgcolor=#E9E9E9
| 58510 ||  || — || December 3, 1996 || Farra d'Isonzo || Farra d'Isonzo || MAR || align=right | 6.1 km || 
|-id=511 bgcolor=#d6d6d6
| 58511 ||  || — || December 4, 1996 || Kitt Peak || Spacewatch || — || align=right | 6.2 km || 
|-id=512 bgcolor=#E9E9E9
| 58512 ||  || — || December 6, 1996 || Kitt Peak || Spacewatch || — || align=right | 5.5 km || 
|-id=513 bgcolor=#d6d6d6
| 58513 ||  || — || December 4, 1996 || Kitt Peak || Spacewatch || KOR || align=right | 3.2 km || 
|-id=514 bgcolor=#d6d6d6
| 58514 ||  || — || December 4, 1996 || Kitt Peak || Spacewatch || — || align=right | 6.2 km || 
|-id=515 bgcolor=#d6d6d6
| 58515 ||  || — || December 8, 1996 || Kitt Peak || Spacewatch || — || align=right | 5.6 km || 
|-id=516 bgcolor=#fefefe
| 58516 ||  || — || December 11, 1996 || Kleť || Kleť Obs. || H || align=right | 1.2 km || 
|-id=517 bgcolor=#E9E9E9
| 58517 || 1997 AJ || — || January 2, 1997 || Oizumi || T. Kobayashi || — || align=right | 5.8 km || 
|-id=518 bgcolor=#d6d6d6
| 58518 ||  || — || January 3, 1997 || Oizumi || T. Kobayashi || — || align=right | 10 km || 
|-id=519 bgcolor=#d6d6d6
| 58519 ||  || — || January 3, 1997 || Oizumi || T. Kobayashi || — || align=right | 6.7 km || 
|-id=520 bgcolor=#E9E9E9
| 58520 ||  || — || January 3, 1997 || Kitt Peak || Spacewatch || — || align=right | 1.9 km || 
|-id=521 bgcolor=#d6d6d6
| 58521 ||  || — || January 2, 1997 || Kitt Peak || Spacewatch || EOS || align=right | 4.9 km || 
|-id=522 bgcolor=#d6d6d6
| 58522 ||  || — || January 10, 1997 || Kitt Peak || Spacewatch || — || align=right | 5.5 km || 
|-id=523 bgcolor=#d6d6d6
| 58523 || 1997 BU || — || January 27, 1997 || Oizumi || T. Kobayashi || — || align=right | 6.2 km || 
|-id=524 bgcolor=#d6d6d6
| 58524 ||  || — || January 26, 1997 || Xinglong || SCAP || — || align=right | 5.5 km || 
|-id=525 bgcolor=#d6d6d6
| 58525 ||  || — || January 31, 1997 || Kitt Peak || Spacewatch || THM || align=right | 4.9 km || 
|-id=526 bgcolor=#d6d6d6
| 58526 ||  || — || January 31, 1997 || Kitt Peak || Spacewatch || — || align=right | 4.8 km || 
|-id=527 bgcolor=#d6d6d6
| 58527 ||  || — || January 31, 1997 || Kitt Peak || Spacewatch || — || align=right | 4.5 km || 
|-id=528 bgcolor=#d6d6d6
| 58528 ||  || — || January 28, 1997 || Xinglong || SCAP || THM || align=right | 5.7 km || 
|-id=529 bgcolor=#fefefe
| 58529 || 1997 CX || — || February 1, 1997 || Oizumi || T. Kobayashi || — || align=right | 2.0 km || 
|-id=530 bgcolor=#d6d6d6
| 58530 ||  || — || February 2, 1997 || Kitt Peak || Spacewatch || LIX || align=right | 7.6 km || 
|-id=531 bgcolor=#d6d6d6
| 58531 ||  || — || February 3, 1997 || Haleakala || NEAT || — || align=right | 9.3 km || 
|-id=532 bgcolor=#fefefe
| 58532 ||  || — || February 2, 1997 || Kitt Peak || Spacewatch || — || align=right | 1.3 km || 
|-id=533 bgcolor=#E9E9E9
| 58533 ||  || — || February 3, 1997 || Kitt Peak || Spacewatch || PAD || align=right | 5.5 km || 
|-id=534 bgcolor=#C2E0FF
| 58534 Logos ||  ||  || February 4, 1997 || Mauna Kea || Mauna Kea Obs. || cubewano (cold)moon || align=right | 189 km || 
|-id=535 bgcolor=#d6d6d6
| 58535 Pattillo || 1997 DP ||  || February 16, 1997 || Needville || Needville Obs. || — || align=right | 5.6 km || 
|-id=536 bgcolor=#E9E9E9
| 58536 ||  || — || March 2, 1997 || Kitt Peak || Spacewatch || AGN || align=right | 2.3 km || 
|-id=537 bgcolor=#d6d6d6
| 58537 ||  || — || March 3, 1997 || Kitt Peak || Spacewatch || HYG || align=right | 4.0 km || 
|-id=538 bgcolor=#d6d6d6
| 58538 ||  || — || March 4, 1997 || Kitt Peak || Spacewatch || — || align=right | 5.7 km || 
|-id=539 bgcolor=#d6d6d6
| 58539 ||  || — || March 5, 1997 || Kitt Peak || Spacewatch || THM || align=right | 3.2 km || 
|-id=540 bgcolor=#fefefe
| 58540 ||  || — || March 3, 1997 || Kitami || K. Endate, K. Watanabe || — || align=right | 3.7 km || 
|-id=541 bgcolor=#d6d6d6
| 58541 ||  || — || March 3, 1997 || Kitami || K. Endate, K. Watanabe || THM || align=right | 7.4 km || 
|-id=542 bgcolor=#d6d6d6
| 58542 ||  || — || March 5, 1997 || Kitt Peak || Spacewatch || — || align=right | 7.1 km || 
|-id=543 bgcolor=#d6d6d6
| 58543 ||  || — || March 11, 1997 || Kitt Peak || Spacewatch || HYG || align=right | 5.3 km || 
|-id=544 bgcolor=#d6d6d6
| 58544 ||  || — || March 10, 1997 || Socorro || LINEAR || — || align=right | 8.6 km || 
|-id=545 bgcolor=#d6d6d6
| 58545 ||  || — || March 10, 1997 || Socorro || LINEAR || — || align=right | 3.8 km || 
|-id=546 bgcolor=#d6d6d6
| 58546 ||  || — || March 31, 1997 || Socorro || LINEAR || — || align=right | 7.2 km || 
|-id=547 bgcolor=#d6d6d6
| 58547 ||  || — || March 31, 1997 || Socorro || LINEAR || — || align=right | 7.1 km || 
|-id=548 bgcolor=#d6d6d6
| 58548 ||  || — || April 3, 1997 || Socorro || LINEAR || — || align=right | 4.4 km || 
|-id=549 bgcolor=#E9E9E9
| 58549 ||  || — || April 3, 1997 || Socorro || LINEAR || — || align=right | 1.9 km || 
|-id=550 bgcolor=#d6d6d6
| 58550 ||  || — || April 5, 1997 || Socorro || LINEAR || ALA || align=right | 8.5 km || 
|-id=551 bgcolor=#d6d6d6
| 58551 ||  || — || April 7, 1997 || Kitt Peak || Spacewatch || — || align=right | 5.2 km || 
|-id=552 bgcolor=#d6d6d6
| 58552 ||  || — || April 3, 1997 || Socorro || LINEAR || THM || align=right | 6.9 km || 
|-id=553 bgcolor=#d6d6d6
| 58553 ||  || — || April 2, 1997 || Socorro || LINEAR || — || align=right | 7.9 km || 
|-id=554 bgcolor=#d6d6d6
| 58554 || 1997 HX || — || April 28, 1997 || Kitt Peak || Spacewatch || — || align=right | 6.3 km || 
|-id=555 bgcolor=#fefefe
| 58555 ||  || — || April 30, 1997 || Kitt Peak || Spacewatch || — || align=right | 1.6 km || 
|-id=556 bgcolor=#d6d6d6
| 58556 ||  || — || April 30, 1997 || Socorro || LINEAR || HYG || align=right | 7.1 km || 
|-id=557 bgcolor=#E9E9E9
| 58557 ||  || — || May 30, 1997 || Kitt Peak || Spacewatch || — || align=right | 3.4 km || 
|-id=558 bgcolor=#d6d6d6
| 58558 ||  || — || June 9, 1997 || Prescott || P. G. Comba || ALA || align=right | 11 km || 
|-id=559 bgcolor=#fefefe
| 58559 ||  || — || June 12, 1997 || Kitt Peak || Spacewatch || — || align=right | 5.0 km || 
|-id=560 bgcolor=#d6d6d6
| 58560 ||  || — || June 7, 1997 || La Silla || E. W. Elst || — || align=right | 6.4 km || 
|-id=561 bgcolor=#E9E9E9
| 58561 ||  || — || June 30, 1997 || Kitt Peak || Spacewatch || — || align=right | 2.5 km || 
|-id=562 bgcolor=#E9E9E9
| 58562 ||  || — || July 2, 1997 || Kitt Peak || Spacewatch || — || align=right | 4.7 km || 
|-id=563 bgcolor=#fefefe
| 58563 ||  || — || July 1, 1997 || Xinglong || SCAP || — || align=right | 1.7 km || 
|-id=564 bgcolor=#fefefe
| 58564 ||  || — || July 9, 1997 || Xinglong || SCAP || — || align=right | 2.7 km || 
|-id=565 bgcolor=#fefefe
| 58565 ||  || — || July 29, 1997 || Majorca || Á. López J., R. Pacheco || — || align=right | 1.8 km || 
|-id=566 bgcolor=#d6d6d6
| 58566 ||  || — || August 5, 1997 || Xinglong || SCAP || KOR || align=right | 3.7 km || 
|-id=567 bgcolor=#E9E9E9
| 58567 || 1997 QB || — || August 21, 1997 || Kleť || Z. Moravec || — || align=right | 2.4 km || 
|-id=568 bgcolor=#fefefe
| 58568 ||  || — || August 31, 1997 || Kleť || Z. Moravec || V || align=right | 1.2 km || 
|-id=569 bgcolor=#fefefe
| 58569 Eboshiyamakouen ||  ||  || August 28, 1997 || Nanyo || T. Okuni || — || align=right | 2.1 km || 
|-id=570 bgcolor=#fefefe
| 58570 ||  || — || September 3, 1997 || Caussols || ODAS || V || align=right | 1.6 km || 
|-id=571 bgcolor=#fefefe
| 58571 ||  || — || September 8, 1997 || Caussols || ODAS || — || align=right | 1.5 km || 
|-id=572 bgcolor=#fefefe
| 58572 Romanella ||  ||  || September 7, 1997 || Montelupo || M. Tombelli, G. Forti || V || align=right | 2.1 km || 
|-id=573 bgcolor=#fefefe
| 58573 Serpieri ||  ||  || September 9, 1997 || Pianoro || V. Goretti || — || align=right | 1.5 km || 
|-id=574 bgcolor=#fefefe
| 58574 ||  || — || September 11, 1997 || Kleť || Kleť Obs. || — || align=right | 1.7 km || 
|-id=575 bgcolor=#fefefe
| 58575 ||  || — || September 11, 1997 || Haleakala || AMOS || — || align=right | 5.8 km || 
|-id=576 bgcolor=#fefefe
| 58576 ||  || — || September 4, 1997 || Xinglong || SCAP || — || align=right | 1.8 km || 
|-id=577 bgcolor=#fefefe
| 58577 || 1997 SV || — || September 16, 1997 || Xinglong || SCAP || V || align=right | 2.7 km || 
|-id=578 bgcolor=#fefefe
| 58578 Žídek ||  ||  || September 24, 1997 || Ondřejov || L. Kotková || NYS || align=right | 1.7 km || 
|-id=579 bgcolor=#fefefe
| 58579 Ehrenberg ||  ||  || September 24, 1997 || Ondřejov || L. Kotková || — || align=right | 1.2 km || 
|-id=580 bgcolor=#fefefe
| 58580 Elenacuoghi ||  ||  || September 24, 1997 || Bologna || E. Colombini || FLO || align=right | 1.7 km || 
|-id=581 bgcolor=#fefefe
| 58581 ||  || — || September 24, 1997 || Farra d'Isonzo || Farra d'Isonzo || FLO || align=right | 1.8 km || 
|-id=582 bgcolor=#fefefe
| 58582 ||  || — || September 25, 1997 || Kleť || Kleť Obs. || V || align=right | 2.2 km || 
|-id=583 bgcolor=#fefefe
| 58583 ||  || — || September 25, 1997 || Dossobuono || L. Lai || — || align=right | 2.1 km || 
|-id=584 bgcolor=#E9E9E9
| 58584 ||  || — || September 29, 1997 || Zeno || T. Stafford || — || align=right | 5.4 km || 
|-id=585 bgcolor=#fefefe
| 58585 ||  || — || September 27, 1997 || Kitt Peak || Spacewatch || — || align=right | 1.8 km || 
|-id=586 bgcolor=#fefefe
| 58586 ||  || — || September 29, 1997 || Kitt Peak || Spacewatch || FLO || align=right | 1.8 km || 
|-id=587 bgcolor=#fefefe
| 58587 ||  || — || September 29, 1997 || Kitt Peak || Spacewatch || — || align=right | 2.3 km || 
|-id=588 bgcolor=#fefefe
| 58588 ||  || — || September 29, 1997 || Kitt Peak || Spacewatch || NYS || align=right | 1.8 km || 
|-id=589 bgcolor=#fefefe
| 58589 ||  || — || September 29, 1997 || Nachi-Katsuura || Y. Shimizu, T. Urata || V || align=right | 2.6 km || 
|-id=590 bgcolor=#fefefe
| 58590 ||  || — || September 29, 1997 || Črni Vrh || H. Mikuž || V || align=right | 1.6 km || 
|-id=591 bgcolor=#fefefe
| 58591 ||  || — || September 29, 1997 || Xinglong || SCAP || — || align=right | 2.0 km || 
|-id=592 bgcolor=#d6d6d6
| 58592 ||  || — || September 30, 1997 || Kitt Peak || Spacewatch || EOS || align=right | 6.1 km || 
|-id=593 bgcolor=#fefefe
| 58593 ||  || — || October 3, 1997 || Caussols || ODAS || — || align=right | 1.8 km || 
|-id=594 bgcolor=#fefefe
| 58594 ||  || — || October 2, 1997 || Kitt Peak || Spacewatch || NYS || align=right | 1.6 km || 
|-id=595 bgcolor=#fefefe
| 58595 Joepollock ||  ||  || October 5, 1997 || Ondřejov || P. Pravec || FLO || align=right | 2.9 km || 
|-id=596 bgcolor=#fefefe
| 58596 ||  || — || October 6, 1997 || Ondřejov || P. Pravec || MAS || align=right | 1.4 km || 
|-id=597 bgcolor=#E9E9E9
| 58597 ||  || — || October 6, 1997 || Ondřejov || P. Pravec || — || align=right | 2.1 km || 
|-id=598 bgcolor=#fefefe
| 58598 ||  || — || October 7, 1997 || Xinglong || SCAP || — || align=right | 2.3 km || 
|-id=599 bgcolor=#d6d6d6
| 58599 ||  || — || October 3, 1997 || Kitt Peak || Spacewatch || CHA || align=right | 3.5 km || 
|-id=600 bgcolor=#fefefe
| 58600 Iwamuroonsen ||  ||  || October 5, 1997 || Nanyo || T. Okuni || — || align=right | 2.1 km || 
|}

58601–58700 

|-bgcolor=#fefefe
| 58601 ||  || — || October 7, 1997 || Xinglong || SCAP || — || align=right | 2.1 km || 
|-id=602 bgcolor=#fefefe
| 58602 ||  || — || October 11, 1997 || Ondřejov || L. Kotková || MAS || align=right | 1.7 km || 
|-id=603 bgcolor=#fefefe
| 58603 ||  || — || October 11, 1997 || Xinglong || SCAP || — || align=right | 3.8 km || 
|-id=604 bgcolor=#E9E9E9
| 58604 ||  || — || October 15, 1997 || Xinglong || SCAP || — || align=right | 3.2 km || 
|-id=605 bgcolor=#fefefe
| 58605 Liutungsheng ||  ||  || October 8, 1997 || Xinglong || SCAP || NYS || align=right | 2.4 km || 
|-id=606 bgcolor=#fefefe
| 58606 ||  || — || October 4, 1997 || Caussols || ODAS || — || align=right | 2.2 km || 
|-id=607 bgcolor=#fefefe
| 58607 Wenzel || 1997 UL ||  || October 19, 1997 || Kleť || J. Tichá, M. Tichý || — || align=right | 2.0 km || 
|-id=608 bgcolor=#E9E9E9
| 58608 Geroldrichter || 1997 UY ||  || October 22, 1997 || Kleť || M. Tichý || — || align=right | 2.9 km || 
|-id=609 bgcolor=#fefefe
| 58609 ||  || — || October 23, 1997 || Kitt Peak || Spacewatch || V || align=right | 1.7 km || 
|-id=610 bgcolor=#E9E9E9
| 58610 ||  || — || October 26, 1997 || Oizumi || T. Kobayashi || — || align=right | 2.7 km || 
|-id=611 bgcolor=#fefefe
| 58611 ||  || — || October 17, 1997 || Xinglong || SCAP || — || align=right | 2.3 km || 
|-id=612 bgcolor=#fefefe
| 58612 ||  || — || October 21, 1997 || Xinglong || SCAP || — || align=right | 2.4 km || 
|-id=613 bgcolor=#E9E9E9
| 58613 ||  || — || October 25, 1997 || Chichibu || N. Satō || — || align=right | 2.5 km || 
|-id=614 bgcolor=#fefefe
| 58614 ||  || — || October 25, 1997 || Chichibu || N. Satō || — || align=right | 2.4 km || 
|-id=615 bgcolor=#fefefe
| 58615 ||  || — || October 23, 1997 || Kitt Peak || Spacewatch || — || align=right | 2.7 km || 
|-id=616 bgcolor=#d6d6d6
| 58616 ||  || — || October 25, 1997 || Kitt Peak || Spacewatch || HYG || align=right | 6.3 km || 
|-id=617 bgcolor=#fefefe
| 58617 ||  || — || October 31, 1997 || Xinglong || SCAP || V || align=right | 2.1 km || 
|-id=618 bgcolor=#fefefe
| 58618 ||  || — || October 29, 1997 || Nanyo || T. Okuni || NYS || align=right | 3.4 km || 
|-id=619 bgcolor=#fefefe
| 58619 ||  || — || October 26, 1997 || Chichibu || N. Satō || — || align=right | 2.5 km || 
|-id=620 bgcolor=#fefefe
| 58620 ||  || — || October 26, 1997 || Chichibu || N. Satō || V || align=right | 2.5 km || 
|-id=621 bgcolor=#fefefe
| 58621 ||  || — || October 27, 1997 || Anderson Mesa || B. A. Skiff || NYS || align=right | 4.5 km || 
|-id=622 bgcolor=#E9E9E9
| 58622 Setoguchi || 1997 VU ||  || November 2, 1997 || Yatsuka || H. Abe, S. Miyasaka || — || align=right | 4.4 km || 
|-id=623 bgcolor=#fefefe
| 58623 ||  || — || November 1, 1997 || Oizumi || T. Kobayashi || — || align=right | 3.1 km || 
|-id=624 bgcolor=#d6d6d6
| 58624 ||  || — || November 1, 1997 || Oizumi || T. Kobayashi || EOS || align=right | 5.0 km || 
|-id=625 bgcolor=#E9E9E9
| 58625 ||  || — || November 1, 1997 || Kitami || K. Endate, K. Watanabe || — || align=right | 3.1 km || 
|-id=626 bgcolor=#fefefe
| 58626 ||  || — || November 1, 1997 || Kushiro || S. Ueda, H. Kaneda || — || align=right | 4.8 km || 
|-id=627 bgcolor=#fefefe
| 58627 Rieko ||  ||  || November 8, 1997 || Toyama || M. Aoki || — || align=right | 2.4 km || 
|-id=628 bgcolor=#E9E9E9
| 58628 ||  || — || November 2, 1997 || Xinglong || SCAP || — || align=right | 5.7 km || 
|-id=629 bgcolor=#E9E9E9
| 58629 ||  || — || November 1, 1997 || Xinglong || SCAP || — || align=right | 4.3 km || 
|-id=630 bgcolor=#fefefe
| 58630 || 1997 WC || — || November 18, 1997 || Oizumi || T. Kobayashi || V || align=right | 1.8 km || 
|-id=631 bgcolor=#fefefe
| 58631 ||  || — || November 23, 1997 || Oizumi || T. Kobayashi || — || align=right | 7.3 km || 
|-id=632 bgcolor=#d6d6d6
| 58632 ||  || — || November 23, 1997 || Oizumi || T. Kobayashi || KOR || align=right | 3.4 km || 
|-id=633 bgcolor=#E9E9E9
| 58633 ||  || — || November 23, 1997 || Oizumi || T. Kobayashi || HEN || align=right | 2.6 km || 
|-id=634 bgcolor=#fefefe
| 58634 ||  || — || November 23, 1997 || Oizumi || T. Kobayashi || MAS || align=right | 1.8 km || 
|-id=635 bgcolor=#E9E9E9
| 58635 ||  || — || November 23, 1997 || Kitt Peak || Spacewatch || — || align=right | 1.9 km || 
|-id=636 bgcolor=#E9E9E9
| 58636 ||  || — || November 21, 1997 || Kitt Peak || Spacewatch || — || align=right | 5.3 km || 
|-id=637 bgcolor=#fefefe
| 58637 ||  || — || November 23, 1997 || Kitt Peak || Spacewatch || V || align=right | 2.5 km || 
|-id=638 bgcolor=#d6d6d6
| 58638 ||  || — || November 23, 1997 || Kitt Peak || Spacewatch || — || align=right | 6.2 km || 
|-id=639 bgcolor=#E9E9E9
| 58639 ||  || — || November 23, 1997 || Kitt Peak || Spacewatch || — || align=right | 3.2 km || 
|-id=640 bgcolor=#fefefe
| 58640 ||  || — || November 23, 1997 || Kitt Peak || Spacewatch || V || align=right | 2.2 km || 
|-id=641 bgcolor=#E9E9E9
| 58641 ||  || — || November 29, 1997 || Kitt Peak || Spacewatch || BAR || align=right | 3.4 km || 
|-id=642 bgcolor=#E9E9E9
| 58642 ||  || — || November 25, 1997 || Kitt Peak || Spacewatch || — || align=right | 2.1 km || 
|-id=643 bgcolor=#fefefe
| 58643 ||  || — || November 28, 1997 || Kitt Peak || Spacewatch || — || align=right | 3.5 km || 
|-id=644 bgcolor=#E9E9E9
| 58644 ||  || — || November 29, 1997 || Socorro || LINEAR || — || align=right | 2.1 km || 
|-id=645 bgcolor=#fefefe
| 58645 ||  || — || November 29, 1997 || Socorro || LINEAR || — || align=right | 4.8 km || 
|-id=646 bgcolor=#E9E9E9
| 58646 ||  || — || November 29, 1997 || Socorro || LINEAR || — || align=right | 3.0 km || 
|-id=647 bgcolor=#fefefe
| 58647 ||  || — || November 29, 1997 || Socorro || LINEAR || — || align=right | 2.6 km || 
|-id=648 bgcolor=#fefefe
| 58648 ||  || — || November 29, 1997 || Socorro || LINEAR || NYS || align=right | 4.2 km || 
|-id=649 bgcolor=#fefefe
| 58649 ||  || — || November 29, 1997 || Socorro || LINEAR || SUL || align=right | 5.8 km || 
|-id=650 bgcolor=#fefefe
| 58650 ||  || — || November 29, 1997 || Socorro || LINEAR || FLO || align=right | 1.8 km || 
|-id=651 bgcolor=#E9E9E9
| 58651 ||  || — || November 29, 1997 || Socorro || LINEAR || slow || align=right | 2.3 km || 
|-id=652 bgcolor=#E9E9E9
| 58652 ||  || — || November 29, 1997 || Socorro || LINEAR || — || align=right | 3.1 km || 
|-id=653 bgcolor=#E9E9E9
| 58653 ||  || — || November 26, 1997 || Socorro || LINEAR || — || align=right | 2.4 km || 
|-id=654 bgcolor=#E9E9E9
| 58654 ||  || — || November 26, 1997 || Socorro || LINEAR || — || align=right | 2.9 km || 
|-id=655 bgcolor=#E9E9E9
| 58655 ||  || — || November 26, 1997 || Socorro || LINEAR || — || align=right | 4.2 km || 
|-id=656 bgcolor=#fefefe
| 58656 ||  || — || November 29, 1997 || Socorro || LINEAR || — || align=right | 2.7 km || 
|-id=657 bgcolor=#fefefe
| 58657 ||  || — || November 29, 1997 || Socorro || LINEAR || — || align=right | 1.9 km || 
|-id=658 bgcolor=#fefefe
| 58658 ||  || — || November 27, 1997 || La Silla || UDTS || V || align=right | 1.5 km || 
|-id=659 bgcolor=#fefefe
| 58659 ||  || — || November 27, 1997 || La Silla || UDTS || — || align=right | 2.6 km || 
|-id=660 bgcolor=#fefefe
| 58660 || 1997 XR || — || December 3, 1997 || Oizumi || T. Kobayashi || — || align=right | 1.6 km || 
|-id=661 bgcolor=#E9E9E9
| 58661 || 1997 XU || — || December 3, 1997 || Oizumi || T. Kobayashi || — || align=right | 4.4 km || 
|-id=662 bgcolor=#E9E9E9
| 58662 ||  || — || December 3, 1997 || Chichibu || N. Satō || — || align=right | 2.8 km || 
|-id=663 bgcolor=#E9E9E9
| 58663 ||  || — || December 9, 1997 || Dynic || A. Sugie || — || align=right | 2.6 km || 
|-id=664 bgcolor=#fefefe
| 58664 IYAMMIX ||  ||  || December 21, 1997 || Kleť || J. Tichá, M. Tichý || ERI || align=right | 4.7 km || 
|-id=665 bgcolor=#E9E9E9
| 58665 ||  || — || December 19, 1997 || Xinglong || SCAP || — || align=right | 4.2 km || 
|-id=666 bgcolor=#E9E9E9
| 58666 ||  || — || December 21, 1997 || Oizumi || T. Kobayashi || — || align=right | 5.4 km || 
|-id=667 bgcolor=#fefefe
| 58667 ||  || — || December 21, 1997 || Chichibu || N. Satō || — || align=right | 2.0 km || 
|-id=668 bgcolor=#fefefe
| 58668 ||  || — || December 17, 1997 || Xinglong || SCAP || V || align=right | 2.7 km || 
|-id=669 bgcolor=#fefefe
| 58669 ||  || — || December 20, 1997 || Bédoin || P. Antonini || FLO || align=right | 1.6 km || 
|-id=670 bgcolor=#E9E9E9
| 58670 ||  || — || December 25, 1997 || Oizumi || T. Kobayashi || — || align=right | 4.7 km || 
|-id=671 bgcolor=#fefefe
| 58671 Diplodocus ||  ||  || December 25, 1997 || Needville || C. Gustava, K. Rivich || — || align=right | 2.8 km || 
|-id=672 bgcolor=#E9E9E9
| 58672 Remigio ||  ||  || December 28, 1997 || Monte Viseggi || Monte Viseggi Obs. || JUN || align=right | 5.6 km || 
|-id=673 bgcolor=#E9E9E9
| 58673 ||  || — || December 25, 1997 || Haleakala || NEAT || — || align=right | 3.7 km || 
|-id=674 bgcolor=#E9E9E9
| 58674 ||  || — || December 21, 1997 || Kitt Peak || Spacewatch || — || align=right | 4.9 km || 
|-id=675 bgcolor=#d6d6d6
| 58675 ||  || — || December 31, 1997 || Oizumi || T. Kobayashi || — || align=right | 9.1 km || 
|-id=676 bgcolor=#fefefe
| 58676 ||  || — || December 31, 1997 || Nachi-Katsuura || Y. Shimizu, T. Urata || NYS || align=right | 2.5 km || 
|-id=677 bgcolor=#fefefe
| 58677 ||  || — || December 28, 1997 || Kitt Peak || Spacewatch || — || align=right | 1.8 km || 
|-id=678 bgcolor=#d6d6d6
| 58678 ||  || — || December 24, 1997 || Xinglong || SCAP || — || align=right | 8.8 km || 
|-id=679 bgcolor=#E9E9E9
| 58679 Brenig || 1998 AH ||  || January 1, 1998 || Bornheim || N. Ehring || — || align=right | 4.4 km || 
|-id=680 bgcolor=#E9E9E9
| 58680 ||  || — || January 8, 1998 || Caussols || ODAS || — || align=right | 7.4 km || 
|-id=681 bgcolor=#E9E9E9
| 58681 ||  || — || January 5, 1998 || Xinglong || SCAP || — || align=right | 4.4 km || 
|-id=682 bgcolor=#E9E9E9
| 58682 Alenašolcová ||  ||  || January 10, 1998 || Kleť || J. Tichá, M. Tichý || — || align=right | 6.3 km || 
|-id=683 bgcolor=#FA8072
| 58683 ||  || — || January 15, 1998 || Caussols || ODAS || — || align=right | 2.5 km || 
|-id=684 bgcolor=#fefefe
| 58684 ||  || — || January 2, 1998 || Socorro || LINEAR || NYS || align=right | 1.6 km || 
|-id=685 bgcolor=#fefefe
| 58685 || 1998 BP || — || January 18, 1998 || Oizumi || T. Kobayashi || FLO || align=right | 1.5 km || 
|-id=686 bgcolor=#E9E9E9
| 58686 ||  || — || January 19, 1998 || Oizumi || T. Kobayashi || — || align=right | 4.5 km || 
|-id=687 bgcolor=#fefefe
| 58687 ||  || — || January 18, 1998 || Kitt Peak || Spacewatch || — || align=right | 1.5 km || 
|-id=688 bgcolor=#E9E9E9
| 58688 ||  || — || January 21, 1998 || Nachi-Katsuura || Y. Shimizu, T. Urata || — || align=right | 10 km || 
|-id=689 bgcolor=#E9E9E9
| 58689 ||  || — || January 22, 1998 || Kitt Peak || Spacewatch || — || align=right | 3.3 km || 
|-id=690 bgcolor=#fefefe
| 58690 ||  || — || January 27, 1998 || Kleť || Kleť Obs. || — || align=right | 1.8 km || 
|-id=691 bgcolor=#E9E9E9
| 58691 Luigisannino ||  ||  || January 24, 1998 || Monte Viseggi || G. Scarfì, L. Zannoni || — || align=right | 2.4 km || 
|-id=692 bgcolor=#E9E9E9
| 58692 ||  || — || January 22, 1998 || Kitt Peak || Spacewatch || — || align=right | 3.3 km || 
|-id=693 bgcolor=#E9E9E9
| 58693 ||  || — || January 28, 1998 || Oizumi || T. Kobayashi || — || align=right | 3.6 km || 
|-id=694 bgcolor=#E9E9E9
| 58694 ||  || — || January 27, 1998 || Kleť || Kleť Obs. || — || align=right | 4.1 km || 
|-id=695 bgcolor=#fefefe
| 58695 ||  || — || January 28, 1998 || Caussols || ODAS || MAS || align=right | 2.0 km || 
|-id=696 bgcolor=#E9E9E9
| 58696 ||  || — || January 18, 1998 || Kitt Peak || Spacewatch || — || align=right | 2.9 km || 
|-id=697 bgcolor=#d6d6d6
| 58697 ||  || — || January 22, 1998 || Kitt Peak || Spacewatch || — || align=right | 4.8 km || 
|-id=698 bgcolor=#E9E9E9
| 58698 ||  || — || January 26, 1998 || Kitt Peak || Spacewatch || — || align=right | 1.8 km || 
|-id=699 bgcolor=#fefefe
| 58699 ||  || — || January 26, 1998 || Xinglong || SCAP || — || align=right | 2.6 km || 
|-id=700 bgcolor=#fefefe
| 58700 ||  || — || January 18, 1998 || Caussols || ODAS || NYS || align=right | 1.7 km || 
|}

58701–58800 

|-bgcolor=#d6d6d6
| 58701 ||  || — || January 18, 1998 || Caussols || ODAS || ALA || align=right | 12 km || 
|-id=702 bgcolor=#E9E9E9
| 58702 Tizianabitossi ||  ||  || January 25, 1998 || Cima Ekar || M. Tombelli, G. Forti || — || align=right | 5.2 km || 
|-id=703 bgcolor=#fefefe
| 58703 ||  || — || January 23, 1998 || Socorro || LINEAR || — || align=right | 5.1 km || 
|-id=704 bgcolor=#d6d6d6
| 58704 ||  || — || January 26, 1998 || Kitt Peak || Spacewatch || THM || align=right | 6.3 km || 
|-id=705 bgcolor=#E9E9E9
| 58705 ||  || — || January 25, 1998 || Haleakala || NEAT || CLO || align=right | 3.7 km || 
|-id=706 bgcolor=#fefefe
| 58706 || 1998 CD || — || February 1, 1998 || Oizumi || T. Kobayashi || FLO || align=right | 1.6 km || 
|-id=707 bgcolor=#E9E9E9
| 58707 Kyoshi || 1998 CS ||  || February 2, 1998 || Kuma Kogen || A. Nakamura || — || align=right | 4.2 km || 
|-id=708 bgcolor=#fefefe
| 58708 ||  || — || February 6, 1998 || Xinglong || SCAP || FLO || align=right | 1.4 km || 
|-id=709 bgcolor=#d6d6d6
| 58709 Zenocolò ||  ||  || February 14, 1998 || San Marcello || L. Tesi, G. Forti || — || align=right | 5.5 km || 
|-id=710 bgcolor=#d6d6d6
| 58710 ||  || — || February 6, 1998 || La Silla || E. W. Elst || — || align=right | 6.5 km || 
|-id=711 bgcolor=#E9E9E9
| 58711 ||  || — || February 6, 1998 || La Silla || E. W. Elst || — || align=right | 3.5 km || 
|-id=712 bgcolor=#fefefe
| 58712 ||  || — || February 6, 1998 || La Silla || E. W. Elst || — || align=right | 4.0 km || 
|-id=713 bgcolor=#fefefe
| 58713 || 1998 DS || — || February 19, 1998 || Modra || A. Galád, A. Pravda || NYS || align=right | 3.7 km || 
|-id=714 bgcolor=#fefefe
| 58714 ||  || — || February 16, 1998 || Xinglong || SCAP || — || align=right | 2.3 km || 
|-id=715 bgcolor=#E9E9E9
| 58715 ||  || — || February 22, 1998 || Haleakala || NEAT || — || align=right | 2.5 km || 
|-id=716 bgcolor=#E9E9E9
| 58716 ||  || — || February 22, 1998 || Haleakala || NEAT || — || align=right | 5.1 km || 
|-id=717 bgcolor=#E9E9E9
| 58717 ||  || — || February 21, 1998 || Xinglong || SCAP || — || align=right | 4.8 km || 
|-id=718 bgcolor=#E9E9E9
| 58718 ||  || — || February 22, 1998 || Haleakala || NEAT || — || align=right | 7.7 km || 
|-id=719 bgcolor=#E9E9E9
| 58719 ||  || — || February 17, 1998 || Xinglong || SCAP || MRX || align=right | 3.2 km || 
|-id=720 bgcolor=#E9E9E9
| 58720 ||  || — || February 19, 1998 || Majorca || Á. López J., R. Pacheco || — || align=right | 5.9 km || 
|-id=721 bgcolor=#d6d6d6
| 58721 ||  || — || February 22, 1998 || Haleakala || NEAT || — || align=right | 15 km || 
|-id=722 bgcolor=#E9E9E9
| 58722 ||  || — || February 23, 1998 || Kitt Peak || Spacewatch || — || align=right | 6.5 km || 
|-id=723 bgcolor=#E9E9E9
| 58723 ||  || — || February 23, 1998 || Kitt Peak || Spacewatch || — || align=right | 2.7 km || 
|-id=724 bgcolor=#d6d6d6
| 58724 ||  || — || February 23, 1998 || Kitt Peak || Spacewatch || — || align=right | 3.7 km || 
|-id=725 bgcolor=#E9E9E9
| 58725 ||  || — || February 24, 1998 || Kitt Peak || Spacewatch || — || align=right | 2.9 km || 
|-id=726 bgcolor=#E9E9E9
| 58726 ||  || — || February 24, 1998 || Kitt Peak || Spacewatch || — || align=right | 5.7 km || 
|-id=727 bgcolor=#fefefe
| 58727 ||  || — || February 22, 1998 || Kitt Peak || Spacewatch || — || align=right | 1.7 km || 
|-id=728 bgcolor=#d6d6d6
| 58728 ||  || — || February 19, 1998 || Farra d'Isonzo || Farra d'Isonzo || — || align=right | 4.3 km || 
|-id=729 bgcolor=#E9E9E9
| 58729 ||  || — || February 22, 1998 || Kitt Peak || Spacewatch || EUN || align=right | 3.4 km || 
|-id=730 bgcolor=#E9E9E9
| 58730 ||  || — || February 26, 1998 || Kitt Peak || Spacewatch || — || align=right | 6.8 km || 
|-id=731 bgcolor=#E9E9E9
| 58731 ||  || — || February 21, 1998 || Xinglong || SCAP || — || align=right | 5.1 km || 
|-id=732 bgcolor=#E9E9E9
| 58732 ||  || — || February 27, 1998 || La Silla || E. W. Elst || — || align=right | 7.7 km || 
|-id=733 bgcolor=#E9E9E9
| 58733 ||  || — || February 27, 1998 || La Silla || E. W. Elst || EUN || align=right | 4.1 km || 
|-id=734 bgcolor=#fefefe
| 58734 || 1998 EP || — || March 2, 1998 || Caussols || ODAS || — || align=right | 1.9 km || 
|-id=735 bgcolor=#fefefe
| 58735 ||  || — || March 2, 1998 || Caussols || ODAS || NYS || align=right | 2.1 km || 
|-id=736 bgcolor=#E9E9E9
| 58736 ||  || — || March 1, 1998 || Caussols || ODAS || — || align=right | 3.7 km || 
|-id=737 bgcolor=#E9E9E9
| 58737 ||  || — || March 14, 1998 || Xinglong || SCAP || EUN || align=right | 3.9 km || 
|-id=738 bgcolor=#fefefe
| 58738 ||  || — || March 1, 1998 || La Silla || E. W. Elst || — || align=right | 1.6 km || 
|-id=739 bgcolor=#fefefe
| 58739 ||  || — || March 1, 1998 || La Silla || E. W. Elst || — || align=right | 1.8 km || 
|-id=740 bgcolor=#d6d6d6
| 58740 ||  || — || March 1, 1998 || La Silla || E. W. Elst || — || align=right | 5.2 km || 
|-id=741 bgcolor=#E9E9E9
| 58741 ||  || — || March 1, 1998 || La Silla || E. W. Elst || — || align=right | 9.1 km || 
|-id=742 bgcolor=#E9E9E9
| 58742 ||  || — || March 1, 1998 || La Silla || E. W. Elst || HNA || align=right | 3.7 km || 
|-id=743 bgcolor=#fefefe
| 58743 ||  || — || March 1, 1998 || La Silla || E. W. Elst || NYS || align=right | 1.5 km || 
|-id=744 bgcolor=#d6d6d6
| 58744 ||  || — || March 1, 1998 || La Silla || E. W. Elst || HYG || align=right | 6.9 km || 
|-id=745 bgcolor=#d6d6d6
| 58745 ||  || — || March 20, 1998 || Kitt Peak || Spacewatch || KOR || align=right | 2.9 km || 
|-id=746 bgcolor=#d6d6d6
| 58746 ||  || — || March 20, 1998 || Kitt Peak || Spacewatch || — || align=right | 4.1 km || 
|-id=747 bgcolor=#fefefe
| 58747 ||  || — || March 24, 1998 || Socorro || LINEAR || H || align=right | 2.1 km || 
|-id=748 bgcolor=#d6d6d6
| 58748 ||  || — || March 22, 1998 || Kitt Peak || Spacewatch || — || align=right | 6.0 km || 
|-id=749 bgcolor=#E9E9E9
| 58749 ||  || — || March 24, 1998 || Caussols || ODAS || AGN || align=right | 4.2 km || 
|-id=750 bgcolor=#E9E9E9
| 58750 ||  || — || March 25, 1998 || Caussols || ODAS || — || align=right | 6.3 km || 
|-id=751 bgcolor=#fefefe
| 58751 ||  || — || March 24, 1998 || Haleakala || NEAT || — || align=right | 2.5 km || 
|-id=752 bgcolor=#E9E9E9
| 58752 ||  || — || March 26, 1998 || Kleť || Kleť Obs. || — || align=right | 2.3 km || 
|-id=753 bgcolor=#d6d6d6
| 58753 ||  || — || March 20, 1998 || Xinglong || SCAP || — || align=right | 3.9 km || 
|-id=754 bgcolor=#fefefe
| 58754 ||  || — || March 21, 1998 || Xinglong || SCAP || — || align=right | 2.4 km || 
|-id=755 bgcolor=#d6d6d6
| 58755 ||  || — || March 26, 1998 || Caussols || ODAS || EOS || align=right | 4.4 km || 
|-id=756 bgcolor=#d6d6d6
| 58756 ||  || — || March 28, 1998 || Caussols || ODAS || — || align=right | 5.9 km || 
|-id=757 bgcolor=#E9E9E9
| 58757 ||  || — || March 20, 1998 || Socorro || LINEAR || — || align=right | 6.8 km || 
|-id=758 bgcolor=#fefefe
| 58758 ||  || — || March 20, 1998 || Socorro || LINEAR || — || align=right | 2.7 km || 
|-id=759 bgcolor=#d6d6d6
| 58759 ||  || — || March 20, 1998 || Socorro || LINEAR || — || align=right | 8.9 km || 
|-id=760 bgcolor=#E9E9E9
| 58760 ||  || — || March 20, 1998 || Socorro || LINEAR || — || align=right | 4.1 km || 
|-id=761 bgcolor=#E9E9E9
| 58761 ||  || — || March 20, 1998 || Socorro || LINEAR || — || align=right | 5.9 km || 
|-id=762 bgcolor=#E9E9E9
| 58762 ||  || — || March 20, 1998 || Socorro || LINEAR || MAR || align=right | 4.6 km || 
|-id=763 bgcolor=#E9E9E9
| 58763 ||  || — || March 20, 1998 || Socorro || LINEAR || — || align=right | 5.8 km || 
|-id=764 bgcolor=#E9E9E9
| 58764 ||  || — || March 20, 1998 || Socorro || LINEAR || — || align=right | 6.3 km || 
|-id=765 bgcolor=#E9E9E9
| 58765 ||  || — || March 20, 1998 || Socorro || LINEAR || — || align=right | 4.2 km || 
|-id=766 bgcolor=#d6d6d6
| 58766 ||  || — || March 20, 1998 || Socorro || LINEAR || — || align=right | 5.4 km || 
|-id=767 bgcolor=#E9E9E9
| 58767 ||  || — || March 20, 1998 || Socorro || LINEAR || — || align=right | 5.6 km || 
|-id=768 bgcolor=#fefefe
| 58768 ||  || — || March 20, 1998 || Socorro || LINEAR || V || align=right | 1.3 km || 
|-id=769 bgcolor=#E9E9E9
| 58769 ||  || — || March 20, 1998 || Socorro || LINEAR || — || align=right | 8.0 km || 
|-id=770 bgcolor=#E9E9E9
| 58770 ||  || — || March 20, 1998 || Socorro || LINEAR || EUN || align=right | 3.9 km || 
|-id=771 bgcolor=#d6d6d6
| 58771 ||  || — || March 20, 1998 || Socorro || LINEAR || — || align=right | 4.1 km || 
|-id=772 bgcolor=#E9E9E9
| 58772 ||  || — || March 20, 1998 || Socorro || LINEAR || AGN || align=right | 3.4 km || 
|-id=773 bgcolor=#d6d6d6
| 58773 ||  || — || March 20, 1998 || Socorro || LINEAR || KOR || align=right | 3.8 km || 
|-id=774 bgcolor=#d6d6d6
| 58774 ||  || — || March 20, 1998 || Socorro || LINEAR || EOS || align=right | 6.3 km || 
|-id=775 bgcolor=#E9E9E9
| 58775 ||  || — || March 20, 1998 || Socorro || LINEAR || — || align=right | 9.7 km || 
|-id=776 bgcolor=#d6d6d6
| 58776 ||  || — || March 20, 1998 || Socorro || LINEAR || TEL || align=right | 3.5 km || 
|-id=777 bgcolor=#d6d6d6
| 58777 ||  || — || March 20, 1998 || Socorro || LINEAR || 629 || align=right | 3.2 km || 
|-id=778 bgcolor=#E9E9E9
| 58778 ||  || — || March 20, 1998 || Socorro || LINEAR || — || align=right | 6.2 km || 
|-id=779 bgcolor=#fefefe
| 58779 ||  || — || March 20, 1998 || Socorro || LINEAR || — || align=right | 2.3 km || 
|-id=780 bgcolor=#fefefe
| 58780 ||  || — || March 20, 1998 || Socorro || LINEAR || FLO || align=right | 2.1 km || 
|-id=781 bgcolor=#d6d6d6
| 58781 ||  || — || March 26, 1998 || Caussols || ODAS || EOS || align=right | 4.6 km || 
|-id=782 bgcolor=#E9E9E9
| 58782 ||  || — || March 26, 1998 || Caussols || ODAS || — || align=right | 2.5 km || 
|-id=783 bgcolor=#E9E9E9
| 58783 ||  || — || March 21, 1998 || Bergisch Gladbach || W. Bickel || — || align=right | 3.6 km || 
|-id=784 bgcolor=#d6d6d6
| 58784 ||  || — || March 24, 1998 || Socorro || LINEAR || EOS || align=right | 6.3 km || 
|-id=785 bgcolor=#E9E9E9
| 58785 ||  || — || March 24, 1998 || Socorro || LINEAR || GEF || align=right | 4.4 km || 
|-id=786 bgcolor=#fefefe
| 58786 ||  || — || March 24, 1998 || Socorro || LINEAR || — || align=right | 1.6 km || 
|-id=787 bgcolor=#d6d6d6
| 58787 ||  || — || March 24, 1998 || Socorro || LINEAR || — || align=right | 5.4 km || 
|-id=788 bgcolor=#d6d6d6
| 58788 ||  || — || March 24, 1998 || Socorro || LINEAR || ANF || align=right | 4.3 km || 
|-id=789 bgcolor=#d6d6d6
| 58789 ||  || — || March 24, 1998 || Socorro || LINEAR || BRA || align=right | 5.1 km || 
|-id=790 bgcolor=#E9E9E9
| 58790 ||  || — || March 24, 1998 || Socorro || LINEAR || XIZ || align=right | 4.2 km || 
|-id=791 bgcolor=#E9E9E9
| 58791 ||  || — || March 24, 1998 || Socorro || LINEAR || EUN || align=right | 4.5 km || 
|-id=792 bgcolor=#E9E9E9
| 58792 ||  || — || March 24, 1998 || Socorro || LINEAR || CLO || align=right | 4.7 km || 
|-id=793 bgcolor=#E9E9E9
| 58793 ||  || — || March 24, 1998 || Socorro || LINEAR || DOR || align=right | 7.0 km || 
|-id=794 bgcolor=#d6d6d6
| 58794 ||  || — || March 24, 1998 || Socorro || LINEAR || — || align=right | 11 km || 
|-id=795 bgcolor=#E9E9E9
| 58795 ||  || — || March 24, 1998 || Socorro || LINEAR || — || align=right | 6.8 km || 
|-id=796 bgcolor=#d6d6d6
| 58796 ||  || — || March 24, 1998 || Socorro || LINEAR || HYG || align=right | 6.5 km || 
|-id=797 bgcolor=#d6d6d6
| 58797 ||  || — || March 31, 1998 || Socorro || LINEAR || — || align=right | 12 km || 
|-id=798 bgcolor=#d6d6d6
| 58798 ||  || — || March 31, 1998 || Socorro || LINEAR || EOS || align=right | 6.0 km || 
|-id=799 bgcolor=#fefefe
| 58799 ||  || — || March 31, 1998 || Socorro || LINEAR || — || align=right | 2.1 km || 
|-id=800 bgcolor=#E9E9E9
| 58800 ||  || — || March 31, 1998 || Socorro || LINEAR || — || align=right | 6.4 km || 
|}

58801–58900 

|-bgcolor=#d6d6d6
| 58801 ||  || — || March 31, 1998 || Socorro || LINEAR || EOS || align=right | 4.1 km || 
|-id=802 bgcolor=#d6d6d6
| 58802 ||  || — || March 31, 1998 || Socorro || LINEAR || — || align=right | 4.5 km || 
|-id=803 bgcolor=#E9E9E9
| 58803 ||  || — || March 31, 1998 || Socorro || LINEAR || HNS || align=right | 2.4 km || 
|-id=804 bgcolor=#E9E9E9
| 58804 ||  || — || March 31, 1998 || Socorro || LINEAR || — || align=right | 7.7 km || 
|-id=805 bgcolor=#d6d6d6
| 58805 ||  || — || March 31, 1998 || Socorro || LINEAR || — || align=right | 4.7 km || 
|-id=806 bgcolor=#E9E9E9
| 58806 ||  || — || March 31, 1998 || Socorro || LINEAR || — || align=right | 4.2 km || 
|-id=807 bgcolor=#E9E9E9
| 58807 ||  || — || March 24, 1998 || Socorro || LINEAR || — || align=right | 2.8 km || 
|-id=808 bgcolor=#d6d6d6
| 58808 ||  || — || March 25, 1998 || Socorro || LINEAR || HYG || align=right | 7.2 km || 
|-id=809 bgcolor=#E9E9E9
| 58809 ||  || — || March 22, 1998 || Socorro || LINEAR || AGN || align=right | 3.0 km || 
|-id=810 bgcolor=#E9E9E9
| 58810 ||  || — || March 28, 1998 || Socorro || LINEAR || — || align=right | 2.6 km || 
|-id=811 bgcolor=#E9E9E9
| 58811 ||  || — || March 24, 1998 || Socorro || LINEAR || — || align=right | 5.7 km || 
|-id=812 bgcolor=#E9E9E9
| 58812 || 1998 GM || — || April 3, 1998 || Kitt Peak || Spacewatch || — || align=right | 2.3 km || 
|-id=813 bgcolor=#d6d6d6
| 58813 ||  || — || April 2, 1998 || Socorro || LINEAR || — || align=right | 10 km || 
|-id=814 bgcolor=#d6d6d6
| 58814 ||  || — || April 2, 1998 || Socorro || LINEAR || — || align=right | 7.0 km || 
|-id=815 bgcolor=#E9E9E9
| 58815 ||  || — || April 2, 1998 || Socorro || LINEAR || — || align=right | 4.5 km || 
|-id=816 bgcolor=#E9E9E9
| 58816 ||  || — || April 2, 1998 || La Silla || E. W. Elst || GEF || align=right | 3.1 km || 
|-id=817 bgcolor=#E9E9E9
| 58817 ||  || — || April 15, 1998 || Socorro || LINEAR || BAR || align=right | 2.1 km || 
|-id=818 bgcolor=#d6d6d6
| 58818 ||  || — || April 20, 1998 || Ondřejov || L. Kotková || EOS || align=right | 7.0 km || 
|-id=819 bgcolor=#d6d6d6
| 58819 ||  || — || April 21, 1998 || Modra || P. Kolény, L. Kornoš || — || align=right | 5.3 km || 
|-id=820 bgcolor=#E9E9E9
| 58820 ||  || — || April 22, 1998 || Kitt Peak || Spacewatch || EUN || align=right | 2.3 km || 
|-id=821 bgcolor=#d6d6d6
| 58821 ||  || — || April 21, 1998 || Caussols || ODAS || — || align=right | 6.8 km || 
|-id=822 bgcolor=#fefefe
| 58822 ||  || — || April 23, 1998 || Socorro || LINEAR || H || align=right | 1.2 km || 
|-id=823 bgcolor=#E9E9E9
| 58823 ||  || — || April 17, 1998 || Kitt Peak || Spacewatch || — || align=right | 1.5 km || 
|-id=824 bgcolor=#d6d6d6
| 58824 ||  || — || April 17, 1998 || Kitt Peak || Spacewatch || EOS || align=right | 5.5 km || 
|-id=825 bgcolor=#d6d6d6
| 58825 ||  || — || April 17, 1998 || Kitt Peak || Spacewatch || — || align=right | 8.7 km || 
|-id=826 bgcolor=#E9E9E9
| 58826 ||  || — || April 18, 1998 || Kitt Peak || Spacewatch || — || align=right | 3.9 km || 
|-id=827 bgcolor=#d6d6d6
| 58827 ||  || — || April 20, 1998 || Kitt Peak || Spacewatch || — || align=right | 4.9 km || 
|-id=828 bgcolor=#d6d6d6
| 58828 ||  || — || April 20, 1998 || Kitt Peak || Spacewatch || — || align=right | 5.1 km || 
|-id=829 bgcolor=#d6d6d6
| 58829 ||  || — || April 18, 1998 || Socorro || LINEAR || — || align=right | 7.2 km || 
|-id=830 bgcolor=#E9E9E9
| 58830 ||  || — || April 20, 1998 || Socorro || LINEAR || — || align=right | 5.4 km || 
|-id=831 bgcolor=#E9E9E9
| 58831 ||  || — || April 20, 1998 || Socorro || LINEAR || HEN || align=right | 3.1 km || 
|-id=832 bgcolor=#fefefe
| 58832 ||  || — || April 22, 1998 || Socorro || LINEAR || H || align=right | 1.6 km || 
|-id=833 bgcolor=#d6d6d6
| 58833 ||  || — || April 20, 1998 || Socorro || LINEAR || — || align=right | 10 km || 
|-id=834 bgcolor=#E9E9E9
| 58834 ||  || — || April 20, 1998 || Socorro || LINEAR || EUN || align=right | 2.6 km || 
|-id=835 bgcolor=#E9E9E9
| 58835 ||  || — || April 20, 1998 || Socorro || LINEAR || — || align=right | 4.7 km || 
|-id=836 bgcolor=#E9E9E9
| 58836 ||  || — || April 24, 1998 || Kitt Peak || Spacewatch || GEF || align=right | 3.0 km || 
|-id=837 bgcolor=#d6d6d6
| 58837 ||  || — || April 20, 1998 || Socorro || LINEAR || EOS || align=right | 5.3 km || 
|-id=838 bgcolor=#d6d6d6
| 58838 ||  || — || April 29, 1998 || Kitt Peak || Spacewatch || EOS || align=right | 4.3 km || 
|-id=839 bgcolor=#E9E9E9
| 58839 ||  || — || April 25, 1998 || Anderson Mesa || LONEOS || DOR || align=right | 7.0 km || 
|-id=840 bgcolor=#fefefe
| 58840 ||  || — || April 21, 1998 || Socorro || LINEAR || V || align=right | 1.8 km || 
|-id=841 bgcolor=#E9E9E9
| 58841 ||  || — || April 21, 1998 || Socorro || LINEAR || EUN || align=right | 5.1 km || 
|-id=842 bgcolor=#E9E9E9
| 58842 ||  || — || April 21, 1998 || Socorro || LINEAR || — || align=right | 2.4 km || 
|-id=843 bgcolor=#d6d6d6
| 58843 ||  || — || April 21, 1998 || Socorro || LINEAR || — || align=right | 6.0 km || 
|-id=844 bgcolor=#d6d6d6
| 58844 ||  || — || April 21, 1998 || Socorro || LINEAR || — || align=right | 9.3 km || 
|-id=845 bgcolor=#E9E9E9
| 58845 ||  || — || April 21, 1998 || Socorro || LINEAR || — || align=right | 3.7 km || 
|-id=846 bgcolor=#d6d6d6
| 58846 ||  || — || April 21, 1998 || Socorro || LINEAR || — || align=right | 6.4 km || 
|-id=847 bgcolor=#d6d6d6
| 58847 ||  || — || April 21, 1998 || Socorro || LINEAR || — || align=right | 13 km || 
|-id=848 bgcolor=#fefefe
| 58848 ||  || — || April 21, 1998 || Socorro || LINEAR || — || align=right | 1.6 km || 
|-id=849 bgcolor=#d6d6d6
| 58849 ||  || — || April 21, 1998 || Socorro || LINEAR || — || align=right | 5.6 km || 
|-id=850 bgcolor=#d6d6d6
| 58850 ||  || — || April 21, 1998 || Socorro || LINEAR || KOR || align=right | 3.1 km || 
|-id=851 bgcolor=#d6d6d6
| 58851 ||  || — || April 21, 1998 || Socorro || LINEAR || — || align=right | 5.7 km || 
|-id=852 bgcolor=#d6d6d6
| 58852 ||  || — || April 21, 1998 || Socorro || LINEAR || — || align=right | 5.4 km || 
|-id=853 bgcolor=#d6d6d6
| 58853 ||  || — || April 21, 1998 || Socorro || LINEAR || HYG || align=right | 7.2 km || 
|-id=854 bgcolor=#d6d6d6
| 58854 ||  || — || April 21, 1998 || Socorro || LINEAR || JLI || align=right | 5.6 km || 
|-id=855 bgcolor=#E9E9E9
| 58855 ||  || — || April 21, 1998 || Socorro || LINEAR || — || align=right | 3.0 km || 
|-id=856 bgcolor=#fefefe
| 58856 ||  || — || April 21, 1998 || Socorro || LINEAR || — || align=right | 1.5 km || 
|-id=857 bgcolor=#d6d6d6
| 58857 ||  || — || April 21, 1998 || Socorro || LINEAR || — || align=right | 6.1 km || 
|-id=858 bgcolor=#d6d6d6
| 58858 ||  || — || April 21, 1998 || Socorro || LINEAR || — || align=right | 8.9 km || 
|-id=859 bgcolor=#d6d6d6
| 58859 ||  || — || April 21, 1998 || Socorro || LINEAR || EOS || align=right | 7.8 km || 
|-id=860 bgcolor=#d6d6d6
| 58860 ||  || — || April 21, 1998 || Socorro || LINEAR || EOS || align=right | 3.7 km || 
|-id=861 bgcolor=#d6d6d6
| 58861 ||  || — || April 21, 1998 || Socorro || LINEAR || — || align=right | 7.2 km || 
|-id=862 bgcolor=#d6d6d6
| 58862 ||  || — || April 28, 1998 || Socorro || LINEAR || — || align=right | 9.5 km || 
|-id=863 bgcolor=#d6d6d6
| 58863 ||  || — || April 25, 1998 || La Silla || E. W. Elst || — || align=right | 8.9 km || 
|-id=864 bgcolor=#E9E9E9
| 58864 ||  || — || April 23, 1998 || Socorro || LINEAR || ADE || align=right | 5.4 km || 
|-id=865 bgcolor=#d6d6d6
| 58865 ||  || — || April 23, 1998 || Socorro || LINEAR || — || align=right | 9.3 km || 
|-id=866 bgcolor=#d6d6d6
| 58866 ||  || — || April 23, 1998 || Socorro || LINEAR || 628 || align=right | 4.1 km || 
|-id=867 bgcolor=#d6d6d6
| 58867 ||  || — || April 23, 1998 || Socorro || LINEAR || — || align=right | 6.1 km || 
|-id=868 bgcolor=#d6d6d6
| 58868 ||  || — || April 23, 1998 || Socorro || LINEAR || — || align=right | 8.0 km || 
|-id=869 bgcolor=#fefefe
| 58869 ||  || — || April 23, 1998 || Socorro || LINEAR || — || align=right | 2.4 km || 
|-id=870 bgcolor=#d6d6d6
| 58870 ||  || — || April 23, 1998 || Socorro || LINEAR || — || align=right | 6.8 km || 
|-id=871 bgcolor=#E9E9E9
| 58871 ||  || — || April 23, 1998 || Socorro || LINEAR || — || align=right | 2.3 km || 
|-id=872 bgcolor=#E9E9E9
| 58872 ||  || — || April 23, 1998 || Socorro || LINEAR || MIT || align=right | 5.1 km || 
|-id=873 bgcolor=#d6d6d6
| 58873 ||  || — || April 23, 1998 || Socorro || LINEAR || — || align=right | 8.5 km || 
|-id=874 bgcolor=#d6d6d6
| 58874 ||  || — || April 23, 1998 || Socorro || LINEAR || — || align=right | 8.5 km || 
|-id=875 bgcolor=#E9E9E9
| 58875 ||  || — || April 23, 1998 || Socorro || LINEAR || — || align=right | 4.7 km || 
|-id=876 bgcolor=#d6d6d6
| 58876 ||  || — || April 23, 1998 || Socorro || LINEAR || EOS || align=right | 4.5 km || 
|-id=877 bgcolor=#d6d6d6
| 58877 ||  || — || April 23, 1998 || Socorro || LINEAR || ALA || align=right | 14 km || 
|-id=878 bgcolor=#d6d6d6
| 58878 ||  || — || April 23, 1998 || Socorro || LINEAR || YAK || align=right | 6.0 km || 
|-id=879 bgcolor=#d6d6d6
| 58879 ||  || — || April 28, 1998 || Socorro || LINEAR || ALA || align=right | 18 km || 
|-id=880 bgcolor=#E9E9E9
| 58880 ||  || — || April 19, 1998 || Socorro || LINEAR || — || align=right | 5.4 km || 
|-id=881 bgcolor=#d6d6d6
| 58881 ||  || — || April 19, 1998 || Socorro || LINEAR || — || align=right | 4.8 km || 
|-id=882 bgcolor=#d6d6d6
| 58882 ||  || — || April 19, 1998 || Socorro || LINEAR || — || align=right | 8.7 km || 
|-id=883 bgcolor=#E9E9E9
| 58883 ||  || — || April 20, 1998 || Socorro || LINEAR || DOR || align=right | 5.3 km || 
|-id=884 bgcolor=#fefefe
| 58884 ||  || — || April 21, 1998 || Socorro || LINEAR || — || align=right | 2.9 km || 
|-id=885 bgcolor=#fefefe
| 58885 ||  || — || April 21, 1998 || Socorro || LINEAR || Vfast? || align=right | 1.2 km || 
|-id=886 bgcolor=#d6d6d6
| 58886 ||  || — || April 21, 1998 || Socorro || LINEAR || — || align=right | 5.3 km || 
|-id=887 bgcolor=#d6d6d6
| 58887 ||  || — || April 21, 1998 || Socorro || LINEAR || — || align=right | 7.4 km || 
|-id=888 bgcolor=#fefefe
| 58888 ||  || — || April 21, 1998 || Socorro || LINEAR || — || align=right | 1.8 km || 
|-id=889 bgcolor=#fefefe
| 58889 ||  || — || April 21, 1998 || Socorro || LINEAR || — || align=right | 1.5 km || 
|-id=890 bgcolor=#d6d6d6
| 58890 ||  || — || April 21, 1998 || Socorro || LINEAR || TEL || align=right | 4.0 km || 
|-id=891 bgcolor=#E9E9E9
| 58891 ||  || — || April 21, 1998 || Socorro || LINEAR || RAF || align=right | 2.8 km || 
|-id=892 bgcolor=#d6d6d6
| 58892 ||  || — || April 25, 1998 || La Silla || E. W. Elst || — || align=right | 8.0 km || 
|-id=893 bgcolor=#d6d6d6
| 58893 ||  || — || April 24, 1998 || Haleakala || NEAT || AEG || align=right | 6.2 km || 
|-id=894 bgcolor=#E9E9E9
| 58894 ||  || — || April 20, 1998 || Socorro || LINEAR || — || align=right | 2.4 km || 
|-id=895 bgcolor=#d6d6d6
| 58895 ||  || — || May 6, 1998 || Caussols || ODAS || HYG || align=right | 6.4 km || 
|-id=896 bgcolor=#E9E9E9
| 58896 Schlosser ||  ||  || May 15, 1998 || Starkenburg Observatory || Starkenburg Obs. || — || align=right | 6.6 km || 
|-id=897 bgcolor=#fefefe
| 58897 || 1998 KZ || — || May 22, 1998 || Socorro || LINEAR || H || align=right | 2.3 km || 
|-id=898 bgcolor=#d6d6d6
| 58898 ||  || — || May 22, 1998 || Anderson Mesa || LONEOS || — || align=right | 7.2 km || 
|-id=899 bgcolor=#d6d6d6
| 58899 ||  || — || May 22, 1998 || Anderson Mesa || LONEOS || — || align=right | 9.9 km || 
|-id=900 bgcolor=#d6d6d6
| 58900 ||  || — || May 23, 1998 || Anderson Mesa || LONEOS || — || align=right | 5.0 km || 
|}

58901–59000 

|-bgcolor=#E9E9E9
| 58901 ||  || — || May 23, 1998 || Anderson Mesa || LONEOS || — || align=right | 6.3 km || 
|-id=902 bgcolor=#d6d6d6
| 58902 ||  || — || May 27, 1998 || Anderson Mesa || LONEOS || TIR || align=right | 7.7 km || 
|-id=903 bgcolor=#fefefe
| 58903 ||  || — || May 25, 1998 || Xinglong || SCAP || — || align=right | 1.7 km || 
|-id=904 bgcolor=#d6d6d6
| 58904 ||  || — || May 22, 1998 || Kitt Peak || Spacewatch || EOS || align=right | 4.0 km || 
|-id=905 bgcolor=#d6d6d6
| 58905 ||  || — || May 23, 1998 || Kitt Peak || Spacewatch || — || align=right | 3.8 km || 
|-id=906 bgcolor=#d6d6d6
| 58906 ||  || — || May 22, 1998 || Socorro || LINEAR || ALA || align=right | 11 km || 
|-id=907 bgcolor=#E9E9E9
| 58907 ||  || — || May 22, 1998 || Socorro || LINEAR || — || align=right | 5.4 km || 
|-id=908 bgcolor=#d6d6d6
| 58908 ||  || — || May 22, 1998 || Socorro || LINEAR || — || align=right | 9.4 km || 
|-id=909 bgcolor=#d6d6d6
| 58909 ||  || — || May 22, 1998 || Socorro || LINEAR || — || align=right | 10 km || 
|-id=910 bgcolor=#E9E9E9
| 58910 ||  || — || May 22, 1998 || Socorro || LINEAR || — || align=right | 2.4 km || 
|-id=911 bgcolor=#E9E9E9
| 58911 ||  || — || May 22, 1998 || Socorro || LINEAR || — || align=right | 2.1 km || 
|-id=912 bgcolor=#d6d6d6
| 58912 ||  || — || May 22, 1998 || Socorro || LINEAR || — || align=right | 6.8 km || 
|-id=913 bgcolor=#E9E9E9
| 58913 ||  || — || May 22, 1998 || Socorro || LINEAR || AGN || align=right | 5.2 km || 
|-id=914 bgcolor=#d6d6d6
| 58914 ||  || — || May 22, 1998 || Socorro || LINEAR || — || align=right | 6.8 km || 
|-id=915 bgcolor=#d6d6d6
| 58915 ||  || — || May 23, 1998 || Socorro || LINEAR || — || align=right | 6.9 km || 
|-id=916 bgcolor=#d6d6d6
| 58916 ||  || — || May 23, 1998 || Socorro || LINEAR || — || align=right | 6.2 km || 
|-id=917 bgcolor=#d6d6d6
| 58917 ||  || — || May 23, 1998 || Socorro || LINEAR || LIX || align=right | 8.3 km || 
|-id=918 bgcolor=#E9E9E9
| 58918 ||  || — || May 23, 1998 || Socorro || LINEAR || — || align=right | 2.3 km || 
|-id=919 bgcolor=#d6d6d6
| 58919 ||  || — || May 23, 1998 || Socorro || LINEAR || TIR || align=right | 3.4 km || 
|-id=920 bgcolor=#fefefe
| 58920 ||  || — || May 27, 1998 || Socorro || LINEAR || H || align=right | 1.4 km || 
|-id=921 bgcolor=#d6d6d6
| 58921 ||  || — || May 21, 1998 || Reedy Creek || J. Broughton || TIR || align=right | 3.9 km || 
|-id=922 bgcolor=#d6d6d6
| 58922 ||  || — || May 22, 1998 || Reedy Creek || J. Broughton || — || align=right | 5.0 km || 
|-id=923 bgcolor=#d6d6d6
| 58923 ||  || — || May 22, 1998 || Socorro || LINEAR || — || align=right | 6.9 km || 
|-id=924 bgcolor=#E9E9E9
| 58924 ||  || — || May 23, 1998 || Socorro || LINEAR || — || align=right | 5.5 km || 
|-id=925 bgcolor=#d6d6d6
| 58925 ||  || — || June 1, 1998 || La Silla || E. W. Elst || — || align=right | 10 km || 
|-id=926 bgcolor=#E9E9E9
| 58926 ||  || — || June 16, 1998 || Kitt Peak || Spacewatch || MRX || align=right | 2.1 km || 
|-id=927 bgcolor=#fefefe
| 58927 ||  || — || June 19, 1998 || Socorro || LINEAR || — || align=right | 2.0 km || 
|-id=928 bgcolor=#d6d6d6
| 58928 ||  || — || June 26, 1998 || Kitt Peak || Spacewatch || THM || align=right | 5.7 km || 
|-id=929 bgcolor=#d6d6d6
| 58929 ||  || — || June 27, 1998 || Kitt Peak || Spacewatch || ALA || align=right | 12 km || 
|-id=930 bgcolor=#E9E9E9
| 58930 ||  || — || June 24, 1998 || Socorro || LINEAR || — || align=right | 4.7 km || 
|-id=931 bgcolor=#C2FFFF
| 58931 Palmys ||  ||  || June 28, 1998 || La Silla || E. W. Elst || L5 || align=right | 28 km || 
|-id=932 bgcolor=#fefefe
| 58932 ||  || — || July 28, 1998 || Xinglong || SCAP || FLO || align=right | 1.8 km || 
|-id=933 bgcolor=#fefefe
| 58933 ||  || — || July 26, 1998 || La Silla || E. W. Elst || — || align=right | 2.0 km || 
|-id=934 bgcolor=#fefefe
| 58934 ||  || — || July 26, 1998 || La Silla || E. W. Elst || — || align=right | 2.4 km || 
|-id=935 bgcolor=#fefefe
| 58935 ||  || — || July 26, 1998 || La Silla || E. W. Elst || NYS || align=right | 2.3 km || 
|-id=936 bgcolor=#fefefe
| 58936 ||  || — || August 13, 1998 || Woomera || F. B. Zoltowski || — || align=right | 1.6 km || 
|-id=937 bgcolor=#E9E9E9
| 58937 ||  || — || August 24, 1998 || Caussols || ODAS || — || align=right | 3.5 km || 
|-id=938 bgcolor=#E9E9E9
| 58938 ||  || — || August 17, 1998 || Socorro || LINEAR || JUN || align=right | 2.3 km || 
|-id=939 bgcolor=#fefefe
| 58939 ||  || — || August 17, 1998 || Socorro || LINEAR || NYS || align=right | 1.4 km || 
|-id=940 bgcolor=#fefefe
| 58940 ||  || — || August 17, 1998 || Socorro || LINEAR || — || align=right | 1.7 km || 
|-id=941 bgcolor=#fefefe
| 58941 Guishida ||  ||  || August 22, 1998 || Xinglong || SCAP || V || align=right | 1.4 km || 
|-id=942 bgcolor=#fefefe
| 58942 ||  || — || August 17, 1998 || Socorro || LINEAR || — || align=right | 2.3 km || 
|-id=943 bgcolor=#E9E9E9
| 58943 ||  || — || August 17, 1998 || Socorro || LINEAR || — || align=right | 2.4 km || 
|-id=944 bgcolor=#fefefe
| 58944 ||  || — || August 17, 1998 || Socorro || LINEAR || — || align=right | 1.9 km || 
|-id=945 bgcolor=#fefefe
| 58945 ||  || — || August 17, 1998 || Socorro || LINEAR || — || align=right | 2.2 km || 
|-id=946 bgcolor=#fefefe
| 58946 ||  || — || August 17, 1998 || Socorro || LINEAR || — || align=right | 2.2 km || 
|-id=947 bgcolor=#E9E9E9
| 58947 ||  || — || August 20, 1998 || Anderson Mesa || LONEOS || — || align=right | 3.2 km || 
|-id=948 bgcolor=#fefefe
| 58948 ||  || — || August 27, 1998 || Anderson Mesa || LONEOS || — || align=right | 4.1 km || 
|-id=949 bgcolor=#fefefe
| 58949 ||  || — || August 30, 1998 || Bergisch Gladbach || W. Bickel || — || align=right | 1.8 km || 
|-id=950 bgcolor=#fefefe
| 58950 ||  || — || August 24, 1998 || Socorro || LINEAR || — || align=right | 1.8 km || 
|-id=951 bgcolor=#E9E9E9
| 58951 ||  || — || August 24, 1998 || Socorro || LINEAR || MIT || align=right | 8.0 km || 
|-id=952 bgcolor=#E9E9E9
| 58952 ||  || — || August 24, 1998 || Socorro || LINEAR || — || align=right | 6.2 km || 
|-id=953 bgcolor=#d6d6d6
| 58953 ||  || — || August 24, 1998 || Socorro || LINEAR || SYL7:4 || align=right | 9.5 km || 
|-id=954 bgcolor=#E9E9E9
| 58954 ||  || — || August 24, 1998 || Socorro || LINEAR || CLO || align=right | 5.5 km || 
|-id=955 bgcolor=#fefefe
| 58955 ||  || — || August 24, 1998 || Socorro || LINEAR || — || align=right | 2.0 km || 
|-id=956 bgcolor=#d6d6d6
| 58956 ||  || — || August 24, 1998 || Socorro || LINEAR || TIR || align=right | 9.7 km || 
|-id=957 bgcolor=#d6d6d6
| 58957 ||  || — || August 28, 1998 || Socorro || LINEAR || — || align=right | 5.5 km || 
|-id=958 bgcolor=#fefefe
| 58958 ||  || — || August 24, 1998 || Socorro || LINEAR || H || align=right | 1.4 km || 
|-id=959 bgcolor=#fefefe
| 58959 ||  || — || August 28, 1998 || Socorro || LINEAR || FLO || align=right | 2.1 km || 
|-id=960 bgcolor=#fefefe
| 58960 ||  || — || August 26, 1998 || La Silla || E. W. Elst || NYS || align=right | 1.7 km || 
|-id=961 bgcolor=#fefefe
| 58961 ||  || — || August 26, 1998 || La Silla || E. W. Elst || — || align=right | 1.8 km || 
|-id=962 bgcolor=#fefefe
| 58962 ||  || — || August 26, 1998 || La Silla || E. W. Elst || V || align=right | 2.1 km || 
|-id=963 bgcolor=#E9E9E9
| 58963 ||  || — || August 26, 1998 || La Silla || E. W. Elst || — || align=right | 3.7 km || 
|-id=964 bgcolor=#d6d6d6
| 58964 ||  || — || August 26, 1998 || La Silla || E. W. Elst || — || align=right | 7.2 km || 
|-id=965 bgcolor=#d6d6d6
| 58965 ||  || — || September 15, 1998 || Caussols || ODAS || — || align=right | 6.5 km || 
|-id=966 bgcolor=#E9E9E9
| 58966 ||  || — || September 14, 1998 || Socorro || LINEAR || — || align=right | 3.3 km || 
|-id=967 bgcolor=#fefefe
| 58967 ||  || — || September 15, 1998 || Anderson Mesa || LONEOS || NYS || align=right | 1.1 km || 
|-id=968 bgcolor=#fefefe
| 58968 ||  || — || September 14, 1998 || Anderson Mesa || LONEOS || FLO || align=right | 2.5 km || 
|-id=969 bgcolor=#fefefe
| 58969 ||  || — || September 15, 1998 || Anderson Mesa || LONEOS || — || align=right | 2.7 km || 
|-id=970 bgcolor=#d6d6d6
| 58970 ||  || — || September 13, 1998 || Kitt Peak || Spacewatch || — || align=right | 4.5 km || 
|-id=971 bgcolor=#fefefe
| 58971 ||  || — || September 13, 1998 || Kitt Peak || Spacewatch || — || align=right | 1.7 km || 
|-id=972 bgcolor=#E9E9E9
| 58972 ||  || — || September 14, 1998 || Socorro || LINEAR || — || align=right | 6.1 km || 
|-id=973 bgcolor=#E9E9E9
| 58973 ||  || — || September 14, 1998 || Socorro || LINEAR || — || align=right | 2.1 km || 
|-id=974 bgcolor=#fefefe
| 58974 ||  || — || September 14, 1998 || Socorro || LINEAR || MAS || align=right | 1.6 km || 
|-id=975 bgcolor=#d6d6d6
| 58975 ||  || — || September 14, 1998 || Socorro || LINEAR || — || align=right | 6.6 km || 
|-id=976 bgcolor=#E9E9E9
| 58976 ||  || — || September 14, 1998 || Socorro || LINEAR || — || align=right | 2.1 km || 
|-id=977 bgcolor=#d6d6d6
| 58977 ||  || — || September 14, 1998 || Socorro || LINEAR || EMA || align=right | 8.2 km || 
|-id=978 bgcolor=#E9E9E9
| 58978 ||  || — || September 14, 1998 || Socorro || LINEAR || — || align=right | 4.7 km || 
|-id=979 bgcolor=#fefefe
| 58979 ||  || — || September 14, 1998 || Socorro || LINEAR || — || align=right | 2.2 km || 
|-id=980 bgcolor=#FA8072
| 58980 ||  || — || September 14, 1998 || Socorro || LINEAR || — || align=right | 2.3 km || 
|-id=981 bgcolor=#E9E9E9
| 58981 ||  || — || September 14, 1998 || Socorro || LINEAR || — || align=right | 2.5 km || 
|-id=982 bgcolor=#fefefe
| 58982 ||  || — || September 14, 1998 || Socorro || LINEAR || — || align=right | 1.9 km || 
|-id=983 bgcolor=#fefefe
| 58983 ||  || — || September 14, 1998 || Socorro || LINEAR || — || align=right | 1.8 km || 
|-id=984 bgcolor=#fefefe
| 58984 ||  || — || September 14, 1998 || Socorro || LINEAR || — || align=right | 4.2 km || 
|-id=985 bgcolor=#fefefe
| 58985 ||  || — || September 14, 1998 || Socorro || LINEAR || — || align=right | 1.9 km || 
|-id=986 bgcolor=#fefefe
| 58986 ||  || — || September 14, 1998 || Socorro || LINEAR || NYS || align=right | 1.5 km || 
|-id=987 bgcolor=#fefefe
| 58987 ||  || — || September 14, 1998 || Socorro || LINEAR || — || align=right | 1.9 km || 
|-id=988 bgcolor=#d6d6d6
| 58988 ||  || — || September 14, 1998 || Socorro || LINEAR || HYG || align=right | 7.8 km || 
|-id=989 bgcolor=#fefefe
| 58989 ||  || — || September 14, 1998 || Socorro || LINEAR || V || align=right | 1.7 km || 
|-id=990 bgcolor=#E9E9E9
| 58990 ||  || — || September 17, 1998 || Caussols || ODAS || — || align=right | 4.7 km || 
|-id=991 bgcolor=#fefefe
| 58991 ||  || — || September 19, 1998 || Needville || W. G. Dillon || — || align=right | 2.1 km || 
|-id=992 bgcolor=#fefefe
| 58992 ||  || — || September 20, 1998 || Kitt Peak || Spacewatch || — || align=right | 1.9 km || 
|-id=993 bgcolor=#d6d6d6
| 58993 ||  || — || September 17, 1998 || Xinglong || SCAP || — || align=right | 6.7 km || 
|-id=994 bgcolor=#fefefe
| 58994 ||  || — || September 18, 1998 || Višnjan Observatory || Višnjan Obs. || NYS || align=right | 1.4 km || 
|-id=995 bgcolor=#fefefe
| 58995 ||  || — || September 17, 1998 || Kitt Peak || Spacewatch || — || align=right | 2.0 km || 
|-id=996 bgcolor=#E9E9E9
| 58996 ||  || — || September 17, 1998 || Kitt Peak || Spacewatch || — || align=right | 4.5 km || 
|-id=997 bgcolor=#E9E9E9
| 58997 ||  || — || September 20, 1998 || Kitt Peak || Spacewatch || — || align=right | 4.0 km || 
|-id=998 bgcolor=#E9E9E9
| 58998 ||  || — || September 21, 1998 || Kitt Peak || Spacewatch || — || align=right | 5.7 km || 
|-id=999 bgcolor=#fefefe
| 58999 ||  || — || September 17, 1998 || Anderson Mesa || LONEOS || — || align=right | 2.4 km || 
|-id=000 bgcolor=#fefefe
| 59000 Beiguan ||  ||  || September 17, 1998 || Xinglong || SCAP || — || align=right | 2.9 km || 
|}

References

External links 
 Discovery Circumstances: Numbered Minor Planets (55001)–(60000) (IAU Minor Planet Center)

0058